The Japanese invasions of Korea, commonly known as the Imjin War, involved two separate yet linked invasions: an initial invasion in 1592, a brief truce in 1596, and a second invasion in 1597. The conflict ended in 1598 with the withdrawal of Japanese forces from the Korean Peninsula after a military stalemate in Korea's southern provinces.

The invasions were launched by Toyotomi Hideyoshi with the intent of conquering the Korean Peninsula and China proper, which were ruled by the Joseon and Ming dynasties, respectively. Japan quickly succeeded in occupying large portions of the Korean Peninsula, but the contribution of reinforcements by the Ming, as well as the disruption of Japanese supply fleets along the western and southern coasts by the Joseon navy, forced the Japanese forces to withdraw from Pyongyang and the northern provinces. Afterwards, with righteous armies (Joseon civilian militias) conducting guerrilla warfare against the occupying Japanese forces and supply difficulties hampering both sides, neither force was able to mount a successful offensive or gain any additional territory, resulting in a military stalemate. The first phase of the invasion ended in 1596, and was followed afterwards by ultimately unsuccessful peace negotiations between Japan and the Ming.

In 1597, Japan renewed its offensive by invading Korea a second time. The pattern of the second invasion largely mirrored that of the first. The Japanese had initial successes on land, capturing several cities and fortresses, only to be halted and forced to withdraw to the southern coastal regions of the peninsula. However, the pursuing Ming and Joseon forces were unable to dislodge the Japanese from these positions, where both sides again became locked in a ten-month-long military stalemate.

With Toyotomi Hideyoshi's death in 1598, limited progress on land, and continued disruption of supply lines by the Joseon navy, the Japanese forces in Korea were ordered to withdraw back to Japan by the new governing Council of Five Elders. Final peace negotiations between the parties followed, and continued for several years, ultimately resulting in the normalization of relations. The Japanese invasions of Korea at the time were the largest seaborne invasions in history, with the Japanese committing over 300,000 men to the campaigns. The size and scale of the invasions would not be matched or surpassed for nearly 350 years until the Normandy landings of June 6, 1944, when nearly 352,000 Allied troops were committed to the invasion.

Names
In Korean, the first invasion (1592–1593) is called the "Japanese Disturbance (倭 亂 ; wae ran) of Imjin", where 1592 is an imjin year in the sexagenary cycle. The second invasion (1597–1598) is called the "Second War of Jeong-yu" (丁酉). Collectively, the invasions are referred to as the "Imjin War".

In Chinese, the wars are referred to as the "Wanli Korean Campaign", after the reigning Chinese emperor, or the "Renchen War to Defend the Nation" (壬辰衛國戰爭). Imjin is the Korean reading of the Chinese phrase renchen (壬辰); Jeong-yu is the Korean reading for dingyou (丁酉).

In Japanese, the war is called Bunroku no eki (文禄の役). Bunroku referring to the Japanese era name spanning the period from 1592 to 1596. The second invasion (1597–1598) is called "Keichō no eki" (慶長の役). During the Edo period (17–19th centuries), the war was also called "Kara iri" (唐入り "entry into China" or, more accurately, "entry into Tang", the dynasty whose name is synonymous with China). Japan's ultimate purpose was the invasion of Ming China. However, during the war, as the reality that the conflict was largely confined to the Korean Peninsula seeped in, Toyotomi Hideyoshi would soon alter his original objectives.

Overview
In 1592, with an army of approximately 158,000 troops, Toyotomi Hideyoshi launched what would end up being the first of two invasions of Korea, with the intent of conquering Joseon Korea and eventually, Ming China. Initially, the Japanese forces saw overwhelming success on land, capturing both Hanseong, the capital of Korea, and Pyongyang, and completing the occupation of large portions of the Korean Peninsula in three months. The Japanese forces, well-trained, confident, and experienced after the numerous battles and conflicts of the Sengoku period, typically held the field in most land engagements. This success on land, however, was constrained by the naval campaigns of the Korean navy which would continue to raid Japanese supply fleets in its coastal waters, hampering the Japanese advances as supply lines were disrupted along the Western Korean coast and Japanese naval reinforcements were repelled. These trends, with some exceptions on both sides, held true throughout much of the conflict.

Under the rule of the Wanli Emperor, Ming China quickly interpreted the Japanese invasions as a challenge and threat to the Imperial Chinese tributary system. The Ming's interest was also to keep the war confined to the Korean peninsula and out of its own territory. They entered into the conflict by dispatching reinforcements to attack from the north. In the engagements that followed, the majority of the Joseon army was focused on defending the northern provinces from Japanese offensives, while also supporting Ming army campaigns to recapture territory occupied by the Japanese. Consequently, it was the combination of these Ming-led land campaigns and Joseon-led naval warfare that eventually forced the Japanese army to withdraw from Pyongyang to the south, where the Japanese continued to occupy Hanseong and the southern regions with the exception of the southwestern Jeolla Province. The pursuing Ming and Joseon armies attempted to advance further into the south, but were halted by the Japanese army at the Battle of Byeokjegwan. Subsequently, the Japanese armies launched a counterattack in an attempt to reoccupy the northern provinces but were repelled by the defending Joseon army at Haengju fortress. Additionally, Joseon's civilian-led armies actively waged guerrilla warfare against the Japanese forces in the south, which weakened the Japanese hold in the cities they occupied. Afterwards, with supply difficulties hampering both sides, neither the Japanese nor the combined Ming and Joseon forces were able to mount a successful offensive or gain any additional territory, resulting in a military stalemate in the areas between Hanseong and Kaesong. The war continued in this manner for five years, and was followed by a brief interlude between 1596 and 1597 during which Japan and the Ming engaged in ultimately unsuccessful peace talks.

In 1597, Japan renewed its offensive by invading Korea a second time. The pattern of the second invasion largely mirrored that of the first. The Japanese had initial successes on land, but the contribution of the Ming forces, as well as the Joseon navy's disruption of Japanese supply fleets, resulted in a withdrawal of Japanese forces towards the coastal regions of the peninsula. The pursuing Ming and Joseon forces, however, failed to dislodge the Japanese from their fortresses and entrenched positions in the southern coastal areas where both sides became locked in a ten-month-long military stalemate.

With Toyotomi Hideyoshi's death in September 1598, limited progress on land, and continued disruption of supply lines along the western and southern coasts by the Joseon navy, the remaining Japanese forces in Korea were ordered to withdraw back to Japan by the new governing Council of Five Elders. Final peace negotiations between the parties followed afterwards and continued for several years, ultimately resulting in the normalization of relations.

Background

Japan and Korea before the war
In 1392, General Yi Seonggye led a successful coup to take political power in Korea from U of Goryeo. Seonggye's followers forced him to take the crown as Taejo of Joseon, thus establishing a new dynasty. In search of a justification for its rule given the lack of a royal bloodline, the new regime received recognition from China and integration into the Imperial Chinese tributary system within the context of the Mandate of Heaven. Within this tributary system, China assumed the role of a "big brother", with Korea maintaining the highest position among the tributary states, which also included countries such as the Ryukyu Kingdom, Lan Xang, Đại Việt, and the Ayutthaya Kingdom, in return for accepting the subservient tributary role of a "younger brother".

In 1402, the Japanese shogun Ashikaga Yoshimitsu (despite not being the Emperor of Japan) was conferred the title of "King of Japan" by the Chinese emperor and through this title had similarly accepted a position in the imperial tributary system as of 1404. This relationship ended in 1408 when Japan, unlike Korea, chose to end its recognition of China's regional hegemony and cancel any further tribute missions. Membership in the tributary system was a prerequisite for any economic exchange with China. In exiting the system, Japan relinquished its trade relationship with China.

One thousand years earlier, the Sui and Tang dynasties of China had complicated political and trading relations with the Three Kingdoms of Korea. Ming China, on the other hand, had close trading and diplomatic relations with the Joseon, which remained integrated in the imperial tributary system, but also received tribute and trade from Japan.

Ming China and Joseon Korea shared much in common. Both emerged during the 14th century after the end of the Yuan dynasty, embraced Confucian ideals in society, and faced similar threats (Jurchen raiders and wokou). Both had competing internal political factions, which would influence decisions made prior to and during the war. Because of close trade and common enemies, Joseon and Ming had a friendly alliance.

Hideyoshi's preparations
By the last decade of the 16th century, Toyotomi Hideyoshi, the most preeminent daimyō, had unified all of Japan in a brief period of peace. Since he came to hold power in the absence of a legitimate successor of the Minamoto lineage necessary for the imperial shōgun commission, he sought military power to legitimize his rule and to decrease his dependence on the imperial family. It is also suggested that Hideyoshi planned an invasion of China to fulfill the dreams of his late lord, Oda Nobunaga, and to mitigate the possible threat of civil disorder or rebellion posed by the large number of now-idle samurai and soldiers in unified Japan. It is also possible that Hideyoshi might have set a more realistic goal of subjugating the smaller neighbouring states (the Ryukyu Islands, Taiwan, and Korea) and treating the larger or more distant countries as trading partners, because throughout the invasion of Korea, Hideyoshi sought for legal tally trade with China.

Hideyoshi's need for military supremacy as a justification for his rule, which lacked shōgunal background, could have, on an international level, been eventually transformed into an order with Japan's neighboring countries below Japan. Hideyoshi did not take the title of Shōgun on the grounds that he lacked the necessary Minamoto descent, but since it was very common in 16th-century Japan for genealogists to "discover" that someone had illustrious ancestry for the right price, that suggests that Hideyoshi was planning on creating a new office for himself to replace the bakufu. Hideyoshi was also tempted by an external conflict to prevent internal rebellion within Japan, which would keep his newly formed state united against a common enemy, and prevent the daimyōs from acting on any ambitions against his rule. Fighting a war away from Japanese territory would also prevent territorial destruction, and maintain the infrastructure of the state. Such considerations would be consistent with the fact that Hideyoshi was not shōgun and had no links with the imperial bloodline.

Stephen Turnbull also suggests personal ambition and megalomania of Hideyoshi as reasons for the invasion. Hideyoshi had, in a series of wars, conquered Japan and now wanted to turn to bigger things, noting that he spoke not only of his desire to "slash his way" into Korea to invade China, but also the Philippines, and India. Furthermore, for thousands of years, China had been the intellectual, economic, military, and political center of East Asia, and traditionally, the states of East Asia had acknowledged the emperors of China as their overlords and paid tribute in exchange for being allowed to trade with China. Japan had usually resisted the demand to pay tribute to China, but shōgun Ashikaga Yoshimitsu had acknowledged the emperor of China as his overlord in return for access to the huge Chinese market. Japan's right to pay tribute and, with it, the right to trade with China was ended in the 1540s by the Ming court in response to raids by Sino-Japanese pirates known as the wakō.

By seeking to invade China, Hideyoshi was in effect claiming for Japan the role traditionally played by China in East Asia as the center of the East Asian international order. He rallied support in Japan as a man of relatively humble origins who owed his position to his military might. Finally, during the 1540s–1550s, the wakō had staged a series of samurai raids into Korea, some of which were so large as to be "mini-invasions". Hideyoshi mistakenly thought his enemies were weak.

Hideyoshi planned for a possible war with Korea long before he had completed the unification of Japan. He made preparations on many fronts. As early as 1578, Hideyoshi, then fighting under Oda Nobunaga against Mōri Terumoto for control of the Chūgoku region, informed Terumoto of Nobunaga's plan to invade China. In 1585, Hideyoshi told the Portuguese Jesuit Father Gaspar Coelho of his wish to conquer all of East Asia. Hideyoshi asked Coelho to send a message to his master, King Philip II of Spain, who was also King Philip I of Portugal, asking that he make his navy available to help Japan (Ming China, Spain, and Portugal were the main naval powers of the time). However, Philip refused Hideyoshi, preferring not to upset China. The defeat of the Odawara-based Hōjō clan in 1590 finally brought about the second unification of Japan, and Hideyoshi began preparing for the next war.

Beginning in March 1591, the Kyūshū daimyōs and their labor forces constructed Nagoya Castle in Nagoya, Saga (modern-day Karatsu, Saga, not to be confused with present day Nagoya city in Aichi Prefecture), as the center for the mobilization of the invasion forces. In 1592, Hideyoshi sent a letter to the Philippines demanding tribute from the Spanish governor general and stating that Japan had already received tribute from Korea (which was a misunderstanding) and the Ryukyus.

As for the military preparations, the construction of as many as 2,000 ships may have begun as early as 1586. To estimate the strength of the Korean military, Hideyoshi sent an assault force of 26 ships to the southern coast of Korea in 1587. On the diplomatic front, Hideyoshi began to establish friendly relations with China long before he had completed the unification of Japan. He also helped to police the trade routes against the wokou.

Diplomatic dealings between Japan and Korea
In 1587, Hideyoshi sent his first envoy, Yutani Yasuhiro, to Korea, which was during the rule of King Seonjo, to re-establish diplomatic relations between Korea and Japan (broken since the Wokou raid in 1555). Hideyoshi hoped to use this as a foundation to induce the Korean court to join Japan in a war against China. Yasuhiro, with his warrior background and an attitude disdainful of the Korean officials and their customs, failed to receive the promise of future ambassadorial missions from Korea.

Around May 1589, Hideyoshi's second embassy, consisting of Sō Yoshitoshi (or Yoshitomo, 柳川調信), Yanagawa Shigenobu, and Buddhist monk Genso (玄蘇), reached Korea and secured the promise of a Korean embassy to Japan in exchange for a group of Korean rebels which had taken refuge in Japan.

In 1587, Hideyoshi had ordered the adopted father of Yoshitoshi and the daimyō of Tsushima Island, Sō Yoshishige, to offer the Joseon Dynasty an ultimatum of submitting to Japan and participating in the conquest of China, or facing the prospect of open war with Japan. However, as Tsushima Island enjoyed a special trading position as the single checkpoint to Korea for all Japanese ships and had permission from Korea to trade with as many as 50 of its own vessels, the Sō family had a vested interest in preventing conflict with Korea, and delayed the talks for nearly two years. Even when Hideyoshi renewed his order, Sō Yoshitoshi reduced the visit to the Korean court to a campaign to better relations between the two countries. Near the end of the ambassadorial mission, Yoshitoshi presented King Seonjo a brace of peafowl and matchlock guns—the first advanced firearms to come to Korea. Ryu Seong-ryong, a high-ranking scholar official, suggested that the military put the arquebus (a matchlock firearm) into production and use, but the Korean court failed to appreciate its merits. This lack of interest and underestimation of the power of the arquebus greatly contributed to the failures of the Korean army early in the war.

In April 1590, the Korean ambassadors, including Hwang Yun-gil and Kim Saung-il, left for Kyoto, where they waited for two months while Hideyoshi was finishing his campaign against the Hojo clan. Upon his return, they exchanged ceremonial gifts and delivered King Seonjo's letter to Hideyoshi. Hideyoshi mistakenly assumed that the Koreans had come to pay a tributary homage to Japan. For this reason, the ambassadors were not given the formal treatment that was due to diplomatic representatives. In the end, the Korean ambassadors asked for Hideyoshi to write a reply to the Korean king, for which they waited 20 days at the port of Sakai. The letter, redrafted as requested by the ambassadors on the ground that it was too discourteous, invited Korea to submit to Japan and join in a war against China.

Upon the ambassadors' return, the Joseon court held serious discussions concerning Japan's invitation, while Hwang Yun-gil reported conflicting estimates of Japanese military strength and intentions. They nonetheless pressed that a war was imminent. Kim Saung-il claimed that Hideyoshi's letter was nothing but a bluff. Moreover, the court, aware only that Japan was in turmoil with various clan armies fighting each other, substantially underrated the combined strength and abilities of many Japanese armies at the time. Some, including King Seonjo, argued that Ming should be informed about the dealings with Japan, as failure to do so could make Ming suspect Korea's allegiance, but the court finally concluded to wait further until the appropriate course of action became definite.

In the end, Hideyoshi's diplomatic negotiations did not produce the desired result with Korea. The Joseon Court approached Japan as a country inferior to Korea, and saw itself as superior according to its favored position within the Chinese tributary system. It mistakenly evaluated Hideyoshi's threats of invasions to be no better than the common wokou Japanese pirate raids. The Korean court handed to Shigenobu and Genso, Hideyoshi's third embassy, King Seonjo's letter rebuking Hideyoshi for challenging the Chinese tributary system. Hideyoshi replied with another letter, but since it was not presented by a diplomat in person as expected by custom, the court ignored it. After this denial of his second request, Hideyoshi proceeded to launch his armies against Korea in 1592.

Forces

Japan

The core of the Japanese forces were the samurai, the military caste of Japan who dominated Japanese society. Japanese society was divided into four castes: samurai, peasants, artisans, and merchants, in that order. The samurai caste owned most of the land in Japan, had the sole right to carry swords and to execute on the spot any commoner who was insufficiently deferential, and were allowed to own horses and ride into battle. The standard samurai weapon by 1592 was the yari, a spear meant to stab, often with a cross-blade that allowed a samurai to pull his opponent from his horse. If samurai wished to cut his opponent rather than stab, the weapons were the ōdachi, an extremely long sword with a huge handle, or the naginata, a polearm with very sharp curved blade. The most famous of all the samurai weapons was the katana, a sword described by the British military historian Stephen Turnbull as "...the finest edged weapon in the history of warfare". Samurai never carried shields, with the katana being used to deflect blows. By 1592, the armor of the samurai was lamellae made from iron or leather scales tied together which had been modified to include solid plate to help protect the samurai from bullets. Samurai engaged in psychological warfare by wearing an iron mask into battle with a mustache made of horsehair and a "sinister grin" attached to the outside.

Overall, 158,800 soldiers, laborers, and transport troops (of whom a quarter had firearms) were prepared to take part in the invasion, with roughly a third of the force being armed fighting units (samurai, their attendants, and ashigaru conscripts), while the other two thirds filled a support function (doctors, priests, secretaries, boatmen, and labourers). The following table shows the forces of Gotō Sumiharu, who held the fief of Fukue (assessed at 140,000 koku) on the Gotō archipelago. Family records show he led a force of 705, with 27 horses, 220 of which were fighting men, while 485 filled a support role. The breakdown of the fighting contingent was the following:
 General: 1 and his horse
 Commissioners: 5 with 5 horses
 Messengers: 3 with 3 horses
 Inspectors: 2 with 2 horses
 Mounted samurai: 11 with 11 horses
 Foot samurai: 40
 Samurai attendants: 38
 Ashigaru conscripts: 120

Another daimyō whose military service quota has been preserved in a written record is Shimazu Yoshihiro, whose contribution broke down to:
 600 samurai
 300 flag bearers
 1,500 arquebusier ashigaru
 1,500 archer ashigaru
 300 spearmen ashigaru
 6,400 laborers and boatmen

The majority of the Japanese fighting troops sent into Korea were ashigaru (light infantry), who were usually conscripted peasants armed with spears, tanegashima (Japanese arquebuses), or yumi (Japanese bows). Unlike the samurai with their expensive suits of armor, the ashigaru wore cheap suits of iron armour around their chests. The ashigaru armed with arquebuses were trained to fight in the European style, with the men trained to fire their guns in formation to create a volley of fire, then to go down on their knees to reload, while the men behind them fired, and the cycle repeated over and over again.

The commander of the Japanese First Division and overall commander of the invasion force was Konishi Yukinaga, a daimyō of Uto from Higo Province in Kyushu, chosen as commander of the invasion force more because of his diplomatic skills than military skills, as Toyotomi Hideyoshi did not expect the Koreans to resist. Konishi had converted to Catholicism in 1583, and was known to the Spanish and Portuguese as Dom Agostinho. Katō Kiyomasa, who led the Second Division into Korea, was known in Japan as Toranosuke ("the young tiger") and to the Koreans as the "devil general", on account of his ferocity. Katō was one of the "Seven Spears of Shizugatake", a group of seven samurai who distinguished themselves in combat at the Battle of Shizugatake in 1583, where samurai had fought one another mano a mano, and where Katō demonstrated his skills with a cross-bladed spear with great effect by cutting so many men, whose severed and salted heads were thereafter tied to a stalk of green bamboo and carried by one of Katō's attendants into battle. Katō was a devoted follower of Nichiren Buddhism, a type of Buddhism closely associated with militarism and ultra-nationalism in Japan, and his relations with the Catholic Konishi were extremely unfriendly, to the extent that the two men almost never met during the campaign in Korea. Katō's battle standard was a white pennant which carried a message alleged to have been written by Nichiren himself reading Namu Myōhō Renge Kyō ("Hail to the Lotus of the Divine Law"). The naval commander was Wakisaka Yasuharu, another of the "Seven Spears of Shizugatake", who had been named daimyō of the island of Awaji in the Seto Inland Sea in 1585, where he learned much about seafaring as the island is located close to whirlpools which are notoriously dangerous for sailors. Toyotomi Hideyoshi never left Japan, remaining near Kyoto; however, the idea of conquering China was his obsession, and throughout the war, he refused to accept defeat, treating the war as simply a question of willpower, believing if only his samurai fought hard enough, he could take China. Turnbull writes: "In a tactical sense, therefore, Hideyoshi cannot be considered as one of the commanders, but, as his will drove the whole project along until he died, his political influence cannot be underestimated".

Ming China
The Ming Chinese army was the largest in Asia, with a total of around 845,000 troops. However, in 1592 the Imperial Army was engaged in wars with the Mongols and in crushing a rebellion in the northwest. The Ming army was capable of considerable feats of organization, for example bringing 400 artillery guns across 480 km of harsh landscape to provide firepower against the Mongols.

The core of the Ming army was the infantry, divided into five sections; those armed with guns, swords, archers with fire arrows, archers with ordinary arrows, and spearmen, backed up by the cavalry and artillery. The basic weapons for the Chinese infantry were the crossbow and the arquebus, while the cavalry were usually mounted archers. Chinese infantry wore conical iron helmets and suits of armor made from leather or iron.

According to Turnbull, "Chinese field artillery and siege cannon were the finest in the region". Chinese artillery was made from cast iron, and were divided into several types, the most important being the "great general gun" and the folang zhi (佛朗支), the latter being breech-loaded artillery guns.

One of the Chinese commanders was Li Rusong, a man who has been traditionally disparaged in Japanese accounts. In Turnbull's estimate, he was "one of Ming China's most accomplished generals". Although Li was defeated at the Battle of Pyokjeyek, his defeat was temporary. He was an able strategist who achieved his goal of forcing the Japanese out of Korea, and Japanese accounts focusing on his defeat at Pyokjeyek served to distract from his achievements.

Another Chinese naval commander was Chen Lin, a native of Guangdong who proved pivotal in defeating Japan and defending Korea. After helping win the war, Chen was celebrated as a hero in Korea and China. Chen subsequently became the founder of the Gwangdong Jin clan of Korea, and today, his descendants are spread across China and Korea. Chen was given the nickname Guangdong Master for his naval and military accomplishments.

Joseon Korea
Officers in the Joseon Army and Navy came exclusively from the aristocracy, but unlike the high militarist Japanese aristocracy trained to be soldiers from their youth onward, for the Joseon aristocracy, scholarship was valued and war was disparaged as something unworthy of a Confucian gentleman-scholar. The quality of Korean generalship was very variable, with some Korean officers being able and others being men who had not devoted much time to the study of war, preferring archery, writing, practicing their calligraphy, and reading Confucian classics. Korean infantrymen wore a Chinese-style hat and helmet, but no armor. The standard Korean sword was the hwando, a curved sword commonly used by Joseon soldiers during peacetime that is shorter, but lighter than its Japanese counterpart. A uniquely Korean weapon was the flail, a  hardwood stick, painted red, acting as the handle for a chain attached to a shaft with iron nails.

The standard Korean gun was the seungja "victory gun", a handheld shotgun-like cannon attached to a staff. Korean artillery, however, was much superior to Japanese artillery, and unlike the Japanese, the Koreans had built ships capable of carrying heavy cannons.

Turnbull wrote that Korea's salvation was its navy. The standard Korean ship was the panokseon, a warship that was not much different from the standard Japanese warships except for the fact that Korean ships carried heavy cannons while the Japanese ships did not. The famous "turtle ships" that were heavily armored and armed and that were to wreak havoc on the Japanese ships were a minority of the Korean navy's ships. Korean and Japanese accounts both talk much of the "turtle ships", but no such ship has survived, and historians still debate about what turtle ships looked like, though most now agree that they were, in fact, turtle-shaped. Admiral Yi Sun-sin, who began the war as the Left Naval Commander of Jeolla Province, was to become the commander of the Korean navy and was described by Turnbull as "Korea's greatest hero" and "one of the outstanding naval commanders in the entire history of the world".

Military capabilities

The two major security threats to Joseon and Ming China at the time were the Jurchen people, who raided along the northern borders, and the wokou, who pillaged the coastal villages and trade ships.

This defensive stance within an environment of relative peace pushed the Koreans to depend on the strength of their fortresses and warships. With the transmission of gunpowder and firearms technology from China during Goryeo, Korea improved upon the original Chinese firearm designs, the thunder crash bomb, and developed advanced cannon which were used with great efficiency at sea. Even though China was the main source of new military technologies in Asia, Korea was a manufacturing base for both cannon and shipbuilding during this era.

Japan, on the other hand, had been in a state of civil war for over a century, which had the result of turning the island nation into a very proficient warlike society. When traders from the Portuguese Empire arrived in Japan and introduced arquebuses and muskets, the Japanese warlords were quick to adapt to this disruptive innovation, producing en masse the tanegashima matchlock. In the ongoing civil strife, the Japanese refined the drills and tactics to make best use of the new weapon, thus giving them a great advantage over the Korean armies.

Korean cannon were not adapted for effective use on land, and firearms were of a less advanced design. The small arms carried by Japanese soldiers proved to be particularly effective during land engagements and sieges. This strategic difference in weapons development and implementation contributed to the trend during the war of Japanese dominance on land and Korean dominance at sea.

As Japan had been at war since the mid-15th century, Toyotomi Hideyoshi had 500,000 battle-hardened soldiers at his disposal to form a remarkable professional army in Asia for the invasion of Korea. While Japan's chaotic state had left the Koreans with a very low estimate of Japan as a military threat, there was a new sense of unity among the different political factions in Japan, as indicated by the "sword hunt" in 1588 (the confiscation of all weapons from the peasants). Along with the hunt came "The Separation Edict" in 1591, which effectively put an end to all Japanese wokou piracy by prohibiting the daimyōs from supporting the pirates within their fiefs. Ironically, the Koreans believed that Hideyoshi's invasion would be just an extension of the previous pirate raids that had been repelled before. As for the military situation in Joseon, the Korean scholar official Ryu Seong-ryong observed, "not one in a hundred [Korean generals] knew the methods of drilling soldiers": rising in rank depended far more on social connections than military knowledge. Korean soldiers were disorganized, ill-trained, and ill-equipped, and they had been used mostly in construction projects such as building castle walls.

Problems with Joseon defense policies

There were several defects with the organization of the Joseon-era Korean military defense system. One example was a policy that stated that local officers could not individually respond to a foreign invasion outside of their jurisdiction until a higher ranking general, appointed by the king's court, arrived with a newly mobilized army. This arrangement was highly inefficient since the nearby forces would remain stationary until the mobile border commander arrived on the scene and took control. Secondly, as the appointed general often came from an outside region, he was likely to be unfamiliar with the natural environment, the available technology, and manpower of the invaded region. Finally, as a main army was never maintained, new and ill-trained recruits conscripted during war constituted a significant part of the army.

The Korean court managed to carry out some reforms, but they remained problematic. For example, the military training center established in 1589 in Gyeongsang Province recruited mostly men either too young or too old to be good soldiers, augmented by some adventure-seeking aristocrats and slaves buying their freedom, because able-bodied men of the right age, targeted by the policy, had higher priorities such as farming and other economic activities.

The dominant form of the Korean fortresses was the sanseong ("mountain fortress"), which consisted of a stone wall that continued around a mountain in a serpentine fashion. These walls were poorly designed with little use of towers and cross-fire positions (usually seen in European fortifications), and were mostly low in height. It was a wartime policy for these fortresses to serve as refuge castles and for everyone to evacuate to one, with those who failed to do so being assumed to be collaborators with the enemy; however, the policy never held any great effect because the fortresses were out of reach for most refugees.

Troop strength
Toyotomi Hideyoshi mobilized his army at Nagoya Castle, located in the old Hizen Province on Kyushu, newly built for the sole purpose of housing the invasion forces and the reserves. None of the original structures remain, but the castle's ruined foundations survive in the formerly separate town of Chinzei, now part of the city of Karatsu in Saga Prefecture. The first invasion consisted of nine divisions totaling 158,800 men, of which the last two of 21,500 were stationed as reserves on Tsushima Island and Iki Island, respectively. The Japanese used a total of 320,000 troops throughout the entire war.

On the other side, Joseon maintained only a few military units with no field army, and its defense depended heavily on the mobilization of the citizen soldiers in case of emergency. During the first invasion, Joseon deployed a total of 84,500 regular troops throughout, assisted by 22,000 irregular volunteers.

Ming troops never numbered more than 60,000 troops in Korea at any point of the war. Over the course of the war, the Ming sent in total 166,700 troops, and also sent 17 million liang worth of silver and supplies to Korea (equivalent to about half a year of revenue for the Ming Empire).

Weapons

Since its introduction by the Portuguese traders on the island of Tanegashima in 1543, the arquebus had become widely used in Japan. While both Korea and China had also been introduced to firearms similar to the Portuguese arquebus, most were older models. The Korean soldiers' small arms were hand cannons with a simple mechanism and with either a gunstock or wooden shaft attached. After the Japanese diplomats presented the Korean court arquebuses as gifts, the Korean scholar-official Ryu Seong-ryong advocated the use of the new weapon, but the Korean court failed to realize its potency. In contrast, the Japanese often deployed the arquebus in combination with archery in war.

During siege actions, Chinese deployed rattan shields and iron pavises (large shields), reputed to be musket-proof. The Chinese used a variety of weapons, including the Chinese long bow, swords, firearms, early kinds of land mines, and early hand grenades.

The Koreans also demonstrated massive use of hwacha—multiple rocket-propelled arrows, notably during the Siege of Pyongyang in January 1593. It had the ability to fire up to 200 singijeon, a type of rocket arrow, all at one time. The hwacha consisted of a two-wheeled cart carrying a board filled with holes into which the singijeon were inserted. Although the Chinese had their own rocket arrows, the Chinese opted for hand-carried hu dun pao, or "crouching tiger cannons".

The Japanese defeated successive Korean armies with a combination of muskets, spears, and swords. While muskets used by the Japanese were superior to Korean bows in terms of penetration and range, the former lacked the fire rate of the latter. Numerous battle accounts from the Annal of Joseon dynasty and various essays, diaries of Korean officials and Korean sword show that musket alone could not ensure victory. By employing both musket and arme blanche ("White Weapons"i.e. metal swords, lances, spears, and the like), the Japanese were able to achieve success during the early phase of the war. Indeed, the ferocious charge of Japanese troops with spears and swords were often more decisive than with muskets. This was because the Koreans were poorly trained in close combat, and lacked battlefield experience and discipline. Thus, Korean soldiers were unable to hold their line against charging Japanese soldiers. The following words from a Korean military official named Shi-eon Lee to the Korean king discusses this weakness:
The King asked him [Shi-eon Lee], "You have already told me about the low accuracy of Japanese muskets. Why, then, are Korean armies having great problem with defeating them?"

[Shi-eon Lee] then answered,
"The Korean soldiers cower before the enemy and flee for their lives even before they have engaged the enemy. As for the commanders, they seldom leave their positions because they fear that they might be executed for deserting. However, there is a limit to executing deserting soldiers since there are so many of them. Truly, the Japanese aren't good musketeers, but they advance so rapidly that they appear right in front of the Koreans in the time Koreans can shoot only two arrows. It is said that Koreans are good archers, but they seldom hit the targets when the enemy is too far away, and are too scared to shoot when the enemy is near because they fear Japanese swords. Archery often becomes useless because Koreans, fearing the Japanese arme blanche, can barely shoot. The Japanese are reputed to be good swordsmen, but it is possible for Koreans to draw swords and hold their ground. However, the Koreans seldom do this and merely run for their lives."

However, another Korean official, Yu Song-nyong, claims that the Japanese arquebusiers had undeniable superiority over long distances, which (along with low discipline and combat experience of the Korean army) was the main cause of defeats:

In the 1592 invasion, everything was swept away. Within a fortnight or a month the cities and fortresses were lost, and everything in the eight directions had crumbled. Although it was [partly] due to there having been a century of peace and the people not being familiar with warfare that this happened, it was really because the Japanese had the use of muskets that could reach beyond several hundred paces, that always pierced what they struck, that came like the wind and the hail, and with which bows and arrows could not compare.

Today, the Japanese exclusively use muskets to attack fortifications. They can reach [the target] from several hundred paces away. Our country's bows and arrows cannot reach them. At any flat spot outside the walls, the Japanese will build earthen mounds and "flying towers." They look down into the fortifications and fire their bullets so that the people inside the fortifications cannot conceal themselves. In the end the fortifications are taken. One cannot blame [the defenders] for their situation.

Japanese soldiers also relied on their advantage in ranged combat. One of the Japanese commanders wrote home in 1592:

Please arrange to send us guns and ammunition. There is absolutely no use for spears. It is vital that you arrange somehow to obtain a number of guns. Furthermore, you should certainly see to it that those person departing [for Korea] understand this situation. The arrangements for guns should receive your closest attention.

The Japanese commander Asano Yoshinaga wrote home to his father:

When the troops come [to Korea] from the province of Kai, have them bring as many guns as possible, for no other equipment is needed. Give strict orders that all men, even the samurai, carry guns.

The Koreans seldom employed field artillery, with cannon being mainly used in siege action and for defending castles. There were only very few instances of Koreans employing artillery in the field, with largely ineffective results. Some irregular Korean units with government-supplied weapons fired explosive shells from mortars, but this occurred only in isolated instances. The Chinese were more active in employing field artillery than the Koreans. One of the notable Chinese field guns was the "Great General Cannon", a large breech-loading cannon with a two-wheeled cart, shooting an iron ball weighing about 10 kilograms. The Japanese employed field artillery only where strategically advantageous in both siege and field warfare situations, often using captured pieces where available.

The Koreans actively deployed their cavalry divisions in action. But the terrain was often mountainous, which was not generally suitable for cavalry. The farmland tended to have many ditches, and it was often barren and lacked grass essential for feeding the horses. In addition, Japanese use of the arquebus at long range and in concentrated volleys negated any possibility of effective cavalry tactics. The Korean cavalrymen's primary weapons were bows, with swords and lances holding only subsidiary positions. Most cavalry action for the Koreans took place in the Battle of Chungju at the beginning of the war, where they were outnumbered and wiped out by Japanese infantry. Although the Japanese divisions also fielded cavalry, they usually dismounted when engaged in action, acting more as mounted infantry. While specialized firearms were used on horseback, most cavalrymen preferred the conventional yari (spear), but its use was limited by the increasing use of firearms by the Koreans and Chinese.

Naval power

In contrast to the Japanese advantages on land, the Koreans possessed an advantage at sea. Because of advanced artillery and shipbuilding technology, along with an extensive naval history against Japanese pirates, the Korean navies fielded highly advanced and formidable ships. By the time of the Japanese invasion, Korea employed the panokseon, a powerful galley-type ship armed with cannon that outranged most Japanese vessels. The Korean navy used this naval superiority to disrupt the Japanese logistical network off the west coast of the Korean Peninsula. This advantage, however, did not affect Japan's ability to continuously reinforce its armies through the supply route from Tsushima in Japan to Busan in Korea, especially once Korean naval bases in the immediate area were neutralized by Japanese ground forces. The Korean navy, led by Yi Sun-sin, would withdraw and re-base in the northern border of Jeolla Province. While not able to entirely prevent reinforcement, the Korean navy continued to harass and inflict losses on the Japanese supply fleets throughout the duration of the war.

As virtually all Japanese ships in the first phase of the war lacked cannon artillery, Korean ships outranged and bombarded Japanese ships with impunity outside the range of the Japanese muskets, arrows, and catapults. When the Japanese attempted to outfit cannon to their ships, their lightweight ship design prohibited using more than a few per vessel, and vessels usually lacked the firepower or range of their Korean counterparts. In order to bolster their fleet, the Japanese considered employing two Portuguese galleons in the invasion.

In addition to a lack of effective naval armament, most Japanese ships were modified merchant vessels more suited for transportation of troops and equipment than fielding artillery weapons.

Ongoing Bozhou Miao rebellion in China
The Bozhou rebellion by the Chiefdom of Bozhou, which lasted from 1589–1600, was going on in Bozhou (Zunyi, Guizhou) in southwestern China at the same time as the Imjin war in Korea. After winning the war, General Chen Lin would later return to Guizhou to quell the uprisings.

Korean military reorganization

Proposal for military reforms 

During the period between the first and second invasions, the Korean government had a chance to examine the reasons why they had been easily overrun by the Japanese. Ryu Seong-ryong, the Prime Minister, spoke out about the Korean disadvantages.

Ryu pointed out that Korean castle defenses were extremely weak, a fact which he had pointed out before the war. He noted how Korean castles had incomplete fortifications and walls that were too easy to scale. He also wanted cannons set up in the walls. Ryu proposed building strong towers with gun turrets for cannons. Besides castles, Ryu wanted to form a line of defenses in Korea. In this kind of defense, the enemy would have to scale many walls in order to reach the capital, Hanseong.

Ryu also pointed out how efficient the Japanese Army was, since it took them only one month to reach Hanseong, and how well-organized the Japanese were. He noted how the Japanese moved their units in complex maneuvers, often weakening their enemy with the use of arquebuses, then attacking with melee weapons.

Military Training Agency
King Seonjo and the Korean court finally began to reform the military. In September 1593, the Military Training Agency (훈련도감, alternately translated as Military Training Command) was established. The agency carefully divided the army into units and companies. Within the companies were squads of archers, arquebusiers, swordsmen, and spear infantry. The agency set up divisional units in each region of Korea and garrisoned battalions at castles. The agency, which originally had less than 80 troops, soon grew to about 10,000.

One of the most important changes was that both upper-class citizens and slaves were subject to the draft. All males had to enter military service to be trained and familiarized with weapons.

It was also around this time that the military officer and military scholar Han Gyo (한교) wrote the martial arts manual Muyejebo, based on the book Jixiao Xinshu by the famous Chinese general Qi Jiguang.

Imjin War: Japanese first invasion (1592–1593)

Initial attacks

Landing of a Japanese army 

On May 23, 1592, the First Division of the Japanese invasion army, consisting of 7,000 men led by Konishi Yukinaga, left Tsushima in the morning, and arrived outside the port city of Busan in the evening. Korean naval intelligence had detected the Japanese fleet, but Won Gyun, the Right Naval Commander of Gyeongsang Province, misidentified the fleet as trading vessels on a mission. A later report of the arrival of an additional 100 Japanese vessels raised his suspicions, but he did nothing about it. Sō Yoshitoshi landed alone on the Busan shore to ask the Koreans for safe passage to China one last time. The Koreans refused as they had previously done, and Sō Yoshitoshi laid siege to the city. Konishi Yukinaga attacked the nearby fort of Dadaejin the next morning. Japanese accounts claim that the battles resulted in the complete annihilation of Korean forces (one claims 8,500 deaths, and another, 30,000 heads), while a Korean account claims that the Japanese themselves took significant losses before sacking the city of Busan. Jeong Bal, the Korean commander at Busan, was killed by a Japanese bullet, and with his death, Korean morale collapsed. In the meantime, Konishi took the fort of Dadaejin, where under heavy volleys of supporting fire, the Japanese were able to place ladders against the walls, and took the fort. Konishi ordered that no prisoners be taken, and the entire garrison was massacred. Konishi and the First Division then turned north, marching to take Hanseong. The disciplined Japanese brought down a rain of bullets that was lethal to anyone not taking cover. On the morning of May 25, 1592, the First Division arrived at the Dongnae Fortress. Konishi sent a message to Song Sang-hyeon, the commander of the fortress, explaining to him that his objective was the conquest of China and if the Koreans would just submit, their lives would be spared. Song replied, "It is easy for me to die, but difficult to let you pass", which led Konishi to order that no prisoners be taken to punish Song for his defiance. The resulting siege of Dongnae lasted twelve hours, killed 3,000, and resulted in a Japanese victory. The Japanese took no prisoners and killed everyone at Dongnae, civilian and military, even killing all of the cats and dogs there. Konishi's intention was to terrify the Koreans into submission by showing them what the price of resisting Japan was, but he instead stimulated Korean resistance, as ordinary Koreans were enraged at an enemy who invaded without provocation and behaved so brutally.

After taking Dongnae, Konishi took the castle of Miryang, which he followed up by taking Daegu, which surrendered without opposition as the Koreans were concentrating their army further north. Having crossed the Nakdong River, Konishi learned that the Koreans were concentrating their troops at Sangju. In the meantime, desperate Korean envoys had been sent to the Forbidden City in Beijing to ask the Wanli Emperor to protect his loyal vassals in Korea by sending an army to drive out the Japanese. The Chinese assured the Koreans that an army would be sent, but they were engaged in a major war in Ningxia, and the Koreans would have to wait for the arrival of their assistance.

Occupation of Gyeongsang Province 
Katō Kiyomasa's Second Division landed in Busan on May 27, and Kuroda Nagamasa's Third Division, west of Nakdong River, on May 28. The Second Division took the abandoned city of Tongdo on May 28, and captured Gyeongju on May 30. The Third Division, upon landing, captured nearby Gimhae castle by keeping the defenders under pressure with gunfire while building ramps up to the walls with bundles of crops. By June 3, the Third Division captured Unsan, Changnyeong, Hyeonpung, and Seongju. Meanwhile, Konishi Yukinaga's First Division passed the Yangsan mountain fortress (captured on the night of the Siege of Dongnae, when its defenders fled after the Japanese scouting parties fired their arquebuses), and captured Miryang castle on the afternoon of May 26. The First Division secured the Cheongdo fortress in the next few days, and destroyed the city of Daegu. By June 3, the First Division crossed the Nakdong River, and stopped at Seonsan mountain.

Battle of Sangju 

Upon receiving news of the Japanese attacks, the Joseon government appointed General Yi Il as the mobile border commander, as was the established policy. General Yi headed to Mungyeong near the beginning of the strategically important Choryong Pass to gather troops, but he had to travel further south to meet the troops assembled at the city of Daegu. There, General Yi moved all troops back to Sangju, except for the survivors of the Siege of Dongnae, who were to be stationed as a rearguard at the Choryong Pass. On June 4, General Yi deployed a force of less than 1,000 men on two small hills to face the approaching First Division. Assuming that the sight of rising smoke was from the burning of buildings by a nearby Japanese force, General Yi sent an officer to scout on horseback. However, as he neared a bridge, the officer was ambushed by Japanese musket fire from below the bridge, and was beheaded. The Korean troops, watching him fall, were greatly demoralized. Soon the Japanese began the Battle of Sangju with their arquebuses. The Koreans replied with their arrows, which fell short of their targets. The Japanese forces, having been divided into three, attacked the Korean lines from both the front and the two flanks. The battle ended with General Yi Il's retreat and 700 Korean casualties.

Battle of Chungju 

General Yi Il then planned to use the Choryong Pass, the only path through the western end of the Sobaek mountain range, to check the Japanese advance. However, another commander appointed by the Joseon government, Sin Rip, had arrived in the area with a cavalry division and moved 100,000 combined troops to the Chungju fortress located above Choryong Pass. Rather than face a siege, Sin Rip decided to fight a battle in the open fields of Tangeumdae, which he felt ideal for the deployment of his cavalry unit. Since the cavalry consisted mostly of new recruits, however, Sin Rip was concerned that his troops may easily be tempted to flee the battle. As a result, he felt the need to trap his forces in the triangular area formed by the convergence of the Tancheon and Han rivers in the shape of a "Y". This field, however, was dotted with flooded rice paddies and was generally not suitable for cavalry action.

On June 5, 1592, the First Division of approximately 18,000 men led by Konishi Yukinaga left Sangju and reached an abandoned fortress at Mungyeong by nightfall. The next day, the First Division arrived at Tangeumdae in the early afternoon, where they faced the Korean cavalry unit at the Battle of Chungju. Konishi divided his forces into three and attacked with arquebuses from both flanks as well as the front. The Korean arrows fell short of the Japanese troops, which were beyond their range, and General Sin's two charges failed to break the Japanese lines. General Sin then killed himself in the river, and the Koreans that tried to escape by the river either drowned or were decapitated by the pursuing Japanese.

Capture of Hanseong 
The Second Division, led by Katō Kiyomasa, arrived at Chungju, with the Third Division camped not far behind. There, Katō expressed his anger against Konishi Yukinaga for not waiting at Busan as planned, and attempting to take all of the glory for himself; Nabeshima Naoshige then proposed a compromise of dividing the Japanese troops into two separate groups to follow two different routes to Hanseong (the capital and present-day Seoul), and allowing Katō Kiyomasa to choose the route that the Second Division would take to reach Hanseong. The division of the Japanese forces was mainly due to the rivalry between Katō and Konishi, but there was a certain "strategic merit" in dividing their forces in that Katō's advance into northeastern Korea would protect the Japanese from any attempt by the Jurchen leader Nurhaci to attack their eastern flank. However, the division of the Japanese forces also meant that Konishi would have to take on the Chinese alone when their army arrived in Korea.

The two divisions began the race to capture Hanseong on June 8, and Katō took the shorter route across the Han River while Konishi went further upstream where smaller waters posed a lesser barrier. Konishi arrived at Hanseong first, on June 10, while the Second Division was halted at the river with no boats with which to cross. The First Division found the castle undefended with its gates tightly locked, as King Seonjo had fled the day before. The Japanese broke into a small floodgate, located in the castle wall, and opened the capital city's gate from within. Katō's Second Division arrived at the capital the next day (having taken the same route as the First Division), and the Third and Fourth Divisions the day after. Meanwhile, the Fifth, Sixth, Seventh, and Eighth Divisions had landed on Busan, with the Ninth Division kept in reserve on the island of Iki.

Parts of Hanseong had already been looted and torched, including bureaus holding the slave records and weapons, and they were already abandoned by its inhabitants. General Gim Myeong-won, in charge of the defenses along the Han River, had retreated. The king's subjects stole the animals in the royal stables and fled before him, leaving their king to rely on farm animals. In every village, the king's party was met by inhabitants, lined up by the road, grieving that their king was abandoning them, and neglecting their duty of paying homage. Parts of the southern shore of the Imjin River were burnt to deprive the Japanese troops of materials with which to make their crossing, and General Gim Myeong-won deployed 12,000 troops at five points along the river.

Japanese campaigns in the north

Crossing of the Imjin River 

While the First Division rested in Hanseong (present-day Seoul), the Second Division began heading north, only to be delayed for two weeks by the Imjin River. The Japanese sent a message to the Koreans on the other bank requesting them to open the way to China, but the Koreans rejected this. Afterwards, the Japanese commanders withdrew their main forces to the safety of the Paju fortress. The Koreans saw this as a retreat, and 13,000 Korean troops launched an attack at dawn against the remaining Japanese troops on the southern shore of the Imjin River. The main Japanese body counterattacked against the isolated Korean troops, and acquired their boats. The Korean troops under General Gim Myeong-won retreated with heavy losses to the Kaesong fortress.

Distribution of Japanese forces in 1592 
With the Kaesong castle having been sacked shortly after General Gim Myeong-won retreated to Pyongyang, the Japanese troops divided their objectives: the First Division would pursue the Korean king in Pyongan Province in the north (where Pyongyang is located); the Second Division would attack Hamgyong Province in the northeastern part of Korea; the Sixth Division would attack Jeolla Province at the southwestern tip of the peninsula; the Fourth Division would secure Gangwon Province in the mid-eastern part of the peninsula; and the Third, Fifth, Seventh, and Eighth Divisions would stabilize the following provinces respectively: Hwanghae Province (below Pyongan Province), Chungcheong Province (below Gyeonggi Province); Gyeongsang Province (in the southeast where the Japanese first had landed); and Gyeonggi Province (where the capital city is located).

Capture of Pyongyang 
The First Division under Konishi Yukinaga proceeded northward, and sacked Pyongsan, Sŏhŭng, Pungsan, Hwangju, and Chunghwa along the way. At Chunghwa, the Third Division under Kuroda Nagamasa joined the First, and continued to the city of Pyongyang located behind the Taedong River. A total of 10,000 Korean troops guarded the city against the 30,000 advancing Japanese. They were led by various commanders, including the Generals Yi Il and Gim Myeong-won, and their defense preparations had assured that no boats were available for Japanese use.

At night, the Koreans silently crossed the river and launched a successful surprise attack against the Japanese encampment. However, this alerted the rest of the Japanese army, which attacked the rear of the Korean positions and destroyed the remaining reinforcements crossing the river. The remainder of the Korean troops then retreated back to Pyongyang, and the Japanese troops gave up their pursuit of the Koreans to observe the manner in which the Koreans had crossed the river.

The next day, using what they had learned from observing the retreating Korean troops, the Japanese began sending troops to the other shore over the shallow points in the river, in a systematic manner, and at this sight the Koreans abandoned the city overnight. On July 20, 1592, the First and Third Divisions entered the deserted city of Pyongyang. In the city, they managed to capture 100,000 tons of military supplies and grain.

Campaigns in Gangwon Province 

The Fourth Division, under the command of Mōri Yoshinari, set out eastward from the capital city of Hanseong in July, and captured a series of fortresses along the eastern coast from Anbyon to Samcheok. The division then turned inward to capture Jeongseon, Yeongwol, and Pyeongchang, and settled down at the provincial capital of Wonju. There, Mōri Yoshinari established a civil administration, systematized social ranks according to the Japanese model, and conducted land surveys. Shimazu Yoshihiro, one of the generals in the Fourth Division, arrived at Gangwon Province late, due to the Umekita uprising, and finished the campaign by securing Chuncheon.

Campaigns in Hamgyong Province and Manchuria 

Katō Kiyomasa, leading the Second Division of more than 20,000 men, crossed the peninsula to Anbyon County with a ten-day march, and swept north along the eastern coast. Among the castles captured was Hamhung, the provincial capital of Hamgyong Province. There, a part of the Second Division was assigned to defense and civil administration.

The rest of the division, 10,000 men, continued north, and fought a battle on August 23 against the southern and northern Hamgyong armies under the command of Yi Yong at Songjin. A Korean cavalry division took advantage of the open field at Songjin, and pushed the Japanese forces into a grain storehouse. There, the Japanese barricaded themselves with bales of rice, and successfully repelled a formation charge from the Korean forces with their arquebuses. While the Koreans planned to renew the battle in the morning, Katō Kiyomasa ambushed them at night. The Second Division completely surrounded the Korean forces, with the exception of an opening leading to a swamp. Those that fled were trapped and slaughtered in the swamp.

The Koreans who fled gave alarm to the other garrisons, allowing the Japanese troops to easily capture Kilju County, Myongchon County, and Kyongsong County. The Second Division then turned inland through Puryong County toward Hoeryong, where two Korean princes had taken refuge. On August 30, 1592, the Second Division entered Hoeryong, where Katō Kiyomasa received the Korean princes and the provincial governor, Yu Yong-rip, these having already been captured by the local inhabitants. Shortly afterward, a Korean warrior band handed over the head of an anonymous Korean general, plus General Han Kuk-ham, tied up in ropes.

Katō Kiyomasa then decided to attack a nearby Jurchen castle across the Tumen River in Manchuria to test his troops against the "barbarians", as the Koreans called the Jurchens (Orangkae in Korean and Orangai, both derived from the Mongol term Uriankhai "forest barbarian"). Kato's army of 8,000 was joined by 3,000 Koreans at Hamgyong Province, because the Jurchens periodically raided across the border. Soon the combined force sacked the castle, and camped near the border; after the Koreans left for home, the Japanese troops suffered a retaliatory assault from the Jurchens. Katō Kiyomasa retreated with his forces to avoid heavy losses. Because of this invasion, rising Jurchen leader Nurhaci offered military assistance to the Joseon and Ming in the war. However, the offer was refused by both countries, particularly Joseon, saying that it would be disgraceful to accept assistance from the "Barbarians" to the north.

The Second Division continued east, capturing the fortresses of Jangseong, Onsong, Kyongwon, and Kyonghung Counties, and finally arrived at Sosupo on the estuary of the Tumen River. There the Japanese rested on the beach, and watched a nearby volcanic island on the horizon that they mistook as Mount Fuji. After the tour, the Japanese continued their previous efforts to bureaucratize and administrate the province, and allowed several garrisons to be handled by the Koreans themselves.

Naval campaigns of 1592 

Having secured Pyongyang, the Japanese planned to cross the Yalu River into Jurchen territory, and use the waters west of the Korean peninsula to supply the invasion. However, Yi Sun-sin, who held the post of the Left Naval Commander of the Jeolla Province (which covers the western waters of Korea), successfully destroyed the Japanese ships transporting troops and supplies. Japan, lacking enough arms and troops to carry on the invasion of China, changed the objective of the war to the occupation of Korea.

When the Japanese troops landed at the port of Busan, Bak (also spelled Park) Hong, the Left Naval Commander of Gyeongsang Province, destroyed his entire fleet, his base, and all armaments and provisions, and fled. Won Gyun, the Right Naval Commander, also destroyed and abandoned his own base, and fled to Konyang with only four ships. Thus, there was no Korean naval activity around Gyeongsang Province, and the surviving two, out of the four total fleets, were active only on the other (west) side of the peninsula. Won Gyun later sent a message to Yi Sun-sin that he had fled to Konyang after being overwhelmed by the Japanese in a fight. A messenger was sent by Yi Sun-sin to the nearby island of Namhae Island to give Yi's order for war preparations, only to find it pillaged and abandoned by its own inhabitants. As soldiers began to flee secretly, Yi Sun-sin gave an order "to arrest the escapees" and had two of the fugitives brought back and beheaded; he then had their heads put out for display. Yi Sun-sin's battles steadily affected the war and put significant strain on the sea lanes along the western Korean Peninsula supporting the Japanese advance.

The Korean navy relied on a network of local fishermen and scouting boats to receive intelligence of the enemy movements. On the dawn of July 21, 1592, Yi Sun-sin and Yi Eok-gi set sail with 24 panokseons, 15 small warships, and 46 boats (i.e. fishing boats), and arrived at the waters of Gyeongsang Province by sunset. The Japanese had been sailing up and down the Korean coast, looting and burning all of the seaside villages, and did not expect opposition from the Korean navy.

The next day, the Jeolla Province fleet sailed to the arranged location where Won Gyun was supposed to meet them, and met Yi Sun-sin on July 23. The augmented flotilla of 91 ships then began circumnavigating Geoje Island, bound for Gadeok Island, but scouting vessels detected 50 Japanese vessels at Okpo harbor . Upon sighting the approaching Korean fleet, some of the Japanese who had been busying themselves with plundering got back to their ships, and began to flee. At this, the Korean fleet encircled the Japanese ships and finished them with artillery bombardments. The Japanese fired with their arrows and arquebuses, but the Koreans kept a good distance from them, rendering the Japanese fire ineffective. A teenage Korean girl, taken by the Japanese to be used as a sex slave on board one of their ships, recalled:

The Koreans spotted five more Japanese vessels that night, and destroyed four. After one day's fighting, Yi Sun-sin's fleet had destroyed 26 Japanese ships. The next day, the Koreans approached 13 Japanese ships at Jeokjinpo. In the same manner as the previous success at Okpo, the Korean fleet destroyed 11 Japanese ships—completing the Battle of Okpo without the loss of a single ship. In his report to King Seonjo about his victory, Admiral Yi Sun-sin found the samurai helmets of the Japanese to be rather strange, writing:

The Japanese generals were shocked to hear of the Battle of Okpo, where the Koreans had not lost a single ship, as it threatened to cut them off from Japan. After his victory, Yi Sun-sin found the burnt out remains of countless coastal villages, where the Japanese had enslaved the women while killing all the men.

About three weeks after the Battle of Okpo, Yi Sun-sin and Won Gyun sailed with a total of 26 ships (23 under Yi Sun-sin) toward the Bay of Sacheon after receiving an intelligence report of the Japanese presence. Yi Sun-sin had left behind his fishing vessels that made up most of his fleet in favor of his newly-completed turtle ship. At Sacheon, the Japanese ships were anchored in the bay below a promontory where the Japanese had set up a command base.

A turtle ship is a vessel of a panokseon design with the removal of the elevated command post, the modification of the gunwales into curved walls, and the addition of a roof covered in iron spikes (and possibly hexagonal iron plates; this is disputed). Its walls contained a total of 36 cannon ports, and also openings above the cannon, through which the ship's crew members could look out and fire their personal arms. The design prevented enemies from boarding the ship and aiming at the personnel inside. The ship was the fastest and most maneuverable warship in the East Asian theater, powered by two sails and 80 oarsmen taking turns on the ship's 16 oars. No more than six turtle ships served throughout the entire war, and their primary role was to cut deep into the enemy lines, cause havoc with their cannons, and destroy the enemy flagship.

On July 8, 1592, the fleet arrived at the Bay of Sacheon, where the outgoing tide prevented the Korean fleet from entering. Therefore, Yi Sun-sin ordered the fleet to feign withdrawal, which the Japanese commander, Wakisaka Yasuharu, observed from his tent on a rock. The Japanese decided to give chase, embarked their 12 ships, and pursued the Korean fleet. The Korean navy counterattacked, with the turtle ship in the front, and successfully destroyed all 12 ships. In his report to King Seonjo, Admiral Yi wrote: "Previously, foreseeing the Japanese invasion, I had a turtle ship made...with a dragon's head, from whose mouth we could fire cannons, and with iron spikes on its back to pierce the enemy's feet when they tried to board. Because it is in the shape of a turtle, our men can look out from inside, but the enemy cannot look in from outside. It moves so swiftly that it can plunge into the midst of even many hundreds of enemy vessel in any weather to attack them with cannonballs and fire throwers". The Japanese followed their code of Bushido by fighting ferociously, but the superior firepower and armor of the turtle ships more than compensated. Admiral Yi commanded from his deck, and was badly wounded when a Japanese sniper put a bullet into his shoulder.

At the Battle of Dangpo, fought by Miruk Island, 21 Japanese ships commanded by Kurushima Michiyuki were in the process of sacking a Korean seaside village, when the Korean fleet appeared to offer a challenge. Yi Sun-sin once again followed his usual tactic of coming forward to challenge, then making a feigned retreat with the Japanese in hot pursuit, before ambushing them on the open sea. A Korean girl who had been taken prisoner and forced to become Kurushima's mistress, in an interview after the battle, said: "On the day of the battle, arrows and bullets rained on the pavilion vessel where he [Kurushima] sat. First he was hit on the brow but was unshaken, but when an arrow pierced his chest, he fell down with a loud cry", while the turtle ship "dashed close to this pavilion vessel and broke it by shooting cannonballs from the dragon's mouth and by pouring down arrows and cannonballs from other cannon".
After his victory, Yi Sun-sin spent the next days searching for more Japanese ships, which he found at Danghangpo. Yi formed his ships in a circle while a turtle ship rammed the Japanese flagship, resulting in a melee battle. Yi wanted to annihilate the Japanese, and fearing that the Japanese might land their ships in order to escape, ordered a feigned retreat to bring the battle out to the open sea, which lowered the odds of the Japanese surviving. Yi noted in his report to King Seonjo that the Japanese had given no mercy to Korean civilians, raping, torturing, and murdering without regard to age and sex, and he would likewise give them no mercy. The feigned retreat worked, with the Japanese following the Koreans to the open sea, and Yi wrote: Then our ships suddenly enveloped the enemy craft from the four directions, attacking them from both flanks at full speed. The turtle with the Flying Squadron Chief on board rammed the enemy's pavilion vessel once again, while wrecking it with cannon fire, and our other ships hit its brocade curtains and sails with fire arrows. Furious flames burst out and the enemy commander fell dead from an arrow hit". All but one of the Japanese ships were taken or sunk, and Yi Sun-sin sent King Seonjo the salted heads of 43 samurai officers. The next day, the one Japanese ship that had escaped was confronted by a Korean ship sent to capture it, leading to a savage fight when the Koreans boarded the Japanese ship. The captain of the Japanese ship "stood alone holding a long sword in his hand and fought to the last without fear", taking 10 arrows to kill him. All 88 sailors of the Japanese ship were killed, and Yi had their ears cut off to be "salted and packed in a box for shipment to the court".

Battle of Hansan Island 

In response to the Korean navy's success, Toyotomi Hideyoshi recalled three commanders from land-based activities: Wakisaka Yasuharu, Katō Yoshiaki, and Kuki Yoshitaka. They were the first commanders with naval responsibilities in the entirety of the Japanese invasion forces. Hideyoshi understood that if the Koreans won command of the sea, this would be the end of the invasion of Korea, and ordered the destruction of the Korean fleet, with Yi Sun Sin's head to be brought to him. Kuki, a former pirate, had the most naval experience, while Katō Yoshiaki was one of the "Seven Spears of Shizugatake". However, the commanders arrived in Busan nine days before Hideyoshi's order was actually issued, and assembled a squadron to counter the Korean navy. Eventually, Wakisaka completed his preparations, and his eagerness to win military honor pushed him to launch an attack against the Koreans without waiting for the other commanders to finish.

The combined Korean navy of 53 ships, under the commands of Yi Sun-sin and Yi Eok-gi, was carrying out a search-and-destroy operation because the Japanese troops on land were advancing into Jeolla Province. Jeolla Province was the only Korean territory to be untouched by major military action, and served as home for the three commanders and the only active Korean naval force. The Korean navy considered it best to destroy naval support for the Japanese to reduce the effectiveness of the enemy ground troops.

On August 13, 1592, the Korean fleet sailing from Miruk Island at Dangpo received local intelligence that a large Japanese fleet was nearby. After surviving a storm, the Korean fleet had anchored off Dangpo, where a local man appeared on the beach with the news that the Japanese fleet had just entered the narrow strait of Gyeonnaeryang that divided Koje Island. The following morning, the Korean fleet spotted the Japanese fleet of 82 vessels anchored in the straits of Gyeonnaeryang. Due to the narrowness of the strait and the hazard posed by the underwater rocks, Yi Sun-sin sent six ships as bait to lure out 63 Japanese vessels into the wider sea. The Japanese fleet pursued. Once in the open water, the Japanese fleet was surrounded by the Korean fleet in a semicircular formation, called a "crane wing" by Yi Sun-sin. With at least three turtle ships (two of which were newly completed) spearheading the clash against the Japanese fleet, the Korean vessels fired volleys of cannonballs into the Japanese formation. The Korean ships then engaged in a free-for-all battle with the Japanese ships, maintaining enough distance to prevent the Japanese from boarding; Yi Sun-sin permitted melee combats only against severely damaged Japanese ships. During the battle, the Korean navy made use of a metal-cased fire bomb that caused substantial damage to Japanese deck crews, and caused fierce fires on board their ships. According to the Wakizaka ki:"A man called Manabe Samanosuke was a ship's captain that day, and the ship he was on was set on fire. This tormented him, and saying that he could face meeting the other samurai in the army again, committed suicide and died". Yi noted that "countless numbers of Japanese were hit by arrows and fell dead into the water", but also complained that "...about four hundred exhausted Japanese, finding no way to escape, deserted their boats and fled ashore".

The battle ended in a Korean victory, with Japanese losses of 59 ships—47 destroyed and 12 captured. Not a single Korean ship was lost during the battle. Several Korean prisoners of war were rescued by the Korean soldiers throughout the fight. Wakisaka Yasuharu escaped due to the speed of his flagship. When the news of the defeat at the Battle of Hansan Island reached Toyotomi Hideyoshi, he ordered that the Japanese invasion forces to cease all further naval operations.

Battle of Angolpo and Danghangpo 

Yi Eok-gi, with his fleet, joined Yi Sun-sin and Won Gyun, and participated in a search for enemy vessels in Gyeongsang Province waters. On July 13, the admirals received intelligence that a group of Japanese ships, including those that escaped from the Battle of Dangpo, was anchored in the Bay of Danghangpo.

On August 16, 1592, Yi Sun-sin led their fleet to the harbor of Angolpo, where 42 Japanese vessels were docked, in the Battle of Angolpo. After a brief skirmish, he ordered a false retreat to the open ocean. The Japanese fleet pursued the Korean fleet, with the flagship taking the lead. However, as the Japanese ships reached the open sea, Admiral Yi ordered the panokseon warships to encircle the Japanese fleet. Surrounded, the Japanese fleet was destroyed.

Battle of Busan 

A naval engagement took place on 1 September 1592, during the first phase of the Japanese invasions of Korea. It was a Korean surprise attack on the fleet of Toyotomi Hideyoshi stationed at Busan. Over the course of the battle, Japanese forces lost 100 ships while no Korean ships were lost. Officer Woon (ko) and six Korean soldiers, as well as countless Japanese soldiers, were killed. However, ultimately, the Korean fleet retreated, failing to take over Busan.  In the Annals of the Joseon Dynasty (a Korean official history, written by a bureaucrat of the Korean government located in Hanyang District), it is recorded that the Korean navy failed to defeat the Japanese at Busan. However, in other primary historical sources, such as the official Joseon compendium (李忠武公全書) written by Joseon bureaucrats, and the War Diary of Yi Sun-sin and his military reports, it is recorded as a decisive Korean victory. Modern historians have also summarized the battle as a decisive Korean victory. Some Korean historians believe the War Diary of Yi Sun-sin more than the Annals of the Joseon Dynasty when they study the Imjin war because he was the on-scene commander.

After the battle, the Korean government promoted Yi to Samdo Sugun Tongjesa (삼도 수군 통제사; 三道水軍統制使), literally "Naval Commander of the Three Provinces", which was the title for the commander of the Korean Navy until 1896.

Korean militias 

From the beginning of the war, the Koreans organized militias that they called "righteous armies" to resist the Japanese invasion. These fighting bands were raised throughout the country, and participated in battles, guerilla raids, sieges, and the transportation and construction of wartime necessities.

There were three main types of Korean "righteous army" militias during the war: the surviving and leaderless Korean regular soldiers, the patriotic yangbans (aristocrats) and commoners, and Buddhist monks. By the summer of 1592, there were about 22,200 Korean guerrillas serving the Righteous Army, who tied up much of the Japanese force.

During the first invasion, Jeolla Province remained the only untouched area on the Korean peninsula. In addition to the successful patrols of the sea by Yi Sun-sin, the activities of volunteer forces pressured the Japanese troops to avoid the province in favour of other priorities.

Gwak Jae-u's campaigns along the Nakdong River 
Gwak Jae-u was a famous leader in the Korean militia movement, the first to form a resistance group against the Japanese invaders. He was a land-owner in the town of Uiryeong, situated by the Nam River in Gyeongsang Province. In Korea, Gwak is remembered as an enigmatic, romantic hero. As the Korean regulars abandoned the town and an attack seemed imminent, Gwak organized 50 townsmen. However, the Third Division went from Changwon straight toward Seongju. When Gwak used abandoned government stores to supply his army, the Gyeongsang Province Governor, Kim Su, branded Gwak's group as rebels, and ordered that it be disbanded. When Gwak asked for help from other landowners, and sent a direct appeal to the king, the governor sent troops against Gwak, in spite of having enough troubles already with the Japanese. However, an official from the capital city then arrived to raise troops in the province, and, since the official lived nearby and actually knew him, he saved Gwak from troubles with the governor.

Gwak Jae-u deployed his troops in guerilla warfare under the cover of the tall reeds on the union of the Nakdong and the Nam rivers. This strategy prevented Japanese forces from gaining easy access to Jeolla Province where Yi Sun-sin and his fleet were stationed.

Battle of Uiryeong/Chongjin 
The Sixth Division, under the command of Kobayakawa Takakage, was in charge of conquering Jeolla Province. The Sixth Division marched to Seongju through the established Japanese route (i.e. the Third Division, above), and cut left to Geumsan in Chungcheong Province, which Kobayakawa secured as his starting base for his invasion of the province.

Ankokuji Ekei, a former Buddhist monk made into a general due to his role in the negotiations between Mōri Terumoto and Toyotomi Hideyoshi, led the units of the Sixth Division charged with the invasion of Jeolla Province. The units began their march to Uiryeong at Changwon, and arrived at the Nam River. Ankokuji's scouts planted meters measuring the river's depths so that the entire squadron could cross the river. Overnight, the Korean militiamen moved the meters into the deeper parts of the river. As the Japanese troops began to cross, the militia of Gwak Jae-u ambushed them, and caused them heavy losses. In the end, to advance into Jeolla Province, Ankokuji's men had to try going north around the insecure grounds and within the security of the Japanese-garrisoned fortresses. At Kaenyong, Ankokuji's target was changed to Gochang, to be taken with the aid of Kobayakawa Takakage. However, the entire Jeolla campaign was then abandoned when Kim Myeon and his guerillas successfully ambushed Ankokuji's troops by firing arrows from hidden positions within the mountains.

Jeolla coalition and Battle of Yongin 
When the Japanese troops were advancing to Hanseong, Yi Gwang, the governor of Jeolla Province, attempted to check the Japanese progress by launching his army toward the capital city. Upon hearing the news that the capital had already been sacked, the governor withdrew his army. On June 4, an advance guard of 1,900 men attempted to take the nearby fortress at Yongin, but the 600 Japanese defenders under Wakizaka Yasuharu avoided engagement with the Koreans until June 5, when the main Japanese troops came to relieve the fortress. The Japanese troops counterattacked successfully against the Jeolla coalition, forcing the Koreans to abandon arms and retreat.

First Geumsan campaign 
Around the time of the mobilization of the volunteer army of General Gwak Jae-u in Gyeongsang Province, Go Gyeong-myeong in Jeolla Province formed a volunteer force of 6,000 men. Go then tried to combine his forces with another militia in Chungcheong Province, but upon crossing the provincial border he heard that Kobayakawa Takakage of the Sixth Division had launched an attack on Jeonju (the capital of Jeolla Province) from the mountain fortress at Geumsan. Go returned to his own territory. Having joined forces with General Gwak Yong, Go then led his soldiers to Geumsan. There, on July 10, the volunteer forces fought with a Japanese army retreating to Geumsan after a defeat at the Battle of Ichi two days earlier on July 8.

Warrior monks 
Prompted by King Seonjo, the Buddhist monk Hyujeong issued a manifesto calling upon all monks to take up arms, writing, "Alas, the way of heaven is no more. The destiny of the land is on the decline. In defiance of heaven and reason, the cruel foe had the temerity to cross the sea aboard a thousand ships". Hyujeong called the samurai "poisonous devils" who were "as virulent as snakes or fierce animals" whose brutality justified abandoning the pacifism of Buddhism to protect the weak and innocent. Hyujeong ended his appeal with a call for monks who were able-bodied to "put on the armor of mercy of Bodhisattvas, hold in hand the treasured sword to fell the devil, wield the lightning bolt of the Eight Deities, and come forward!". At least 8,000 monks responded to Hyujeong's call, some out of a sense of Korean patriotism and others motivated by a desire to improve the status of Buddhism, which suffered discrimination from a Sinophile court intent upon promoting Confucianism.

In Chungcheong Province, the abbot Yeonggyu proved to be an active guerrilla leader and together with the Righteous Army of 1,100 commanded by Jo Heon attacked and defeated the Japanese at the Battle of Cheongju on 6 September 1592. After the victory, the Korean leaders began to quarrel among themselves over who was most responsible, and it was that when the Koreans took the offensive, the regulars under Yun Songak refused to take part while the Righteous Army under Jo Heon and the warrior monks under abbot Yeonggyu marched separately. On 22 September 1592, Jo Heon, with 700 Righteous Army guerrillas, attacked a Japanese force of 10,000 under Kobayakawa Takakage. Turnbull described the second battle of Geumsan as an act of folly on Jo's part as his outnumbered force took on "10,000 of the toughest samurai", who encircled the Righteous Army and "exterminated" them, wiping out the entire Korean force as Kobayakawa ordered that no prisoners be taken. Feeling obligated to come to Jo's aid, the abbot Yeonggyu now led his warrior monks against Kobayakawa at the third battle of Geumsan, who likewise suffered the same fate—"total annihilation". However, as the Geumsan salient had taken three successive Korean attacks in a row in a single month, the 6th Division under Kobayakawa was pulled back as Toyotomi Hideyoshi decided the salient was not worth the trouble to hold it, and to the suffering people of the region that was all that mattered. The Japanese withdrawal inspired further guerrilla attacks and one Righteous Army leader, Pak Chin, had an object hurled over the walls of the Japanese-held town of Gyeongju, which caused "the robbers", as Korean accounts always called the Japanese, to go examine it. The object turned out to be a bomb that killed 30 Japanese. Fearing his garrison was now under-strength, the Japanese commander ordered a retreat to the coastal wajo (castle) at Sosaengpo.

Siege of Jinju 

Jinju was a strategic stronghold that defended Gyeongsang Province. The Japanese commanders knew that control of Jinju would mean easy access to the ricebelts of Jeolla Province. Accordingly, a large army under Hosokawa Tadaoki approached Jinju. Jinju was defended by Gim Si-min, one of the better generals in Korea, commanding a Korean garrison of 3,000 men. Gim had recently acquired about 170 new arquebuses that were equal in strength to the Japanese guns. As customary, the Japanese began to collect heads, with the Taikōki mentioning how a samurai named Jirōza'emon "took the first head and raised it aloft. The other five men also attacked and took some excellent heads". The Japanese had usually had little trouble with taking Korean castles and towns, and a certain contempt for the fighting abilities of the Koreans was common among the samurai, so it was a great surprise for the Japanese when they assaulted Jinju to be hit with a barrage of fire as Gim's men dropped heavy stones and bombs while firing their arquebuses, stopping their assault cold.

Hosokawa ordered a new assault with the samurai advancing this time under bamboo shields with covering fire from their arquebuses, which allowed them to place ladders across the walls of Jinju. A scene of carnage occurred, with the Koreans dumping rocks and delayed action bombs down on the Japanese. The Taikōki reported:

For three days, the Japanese attacked Jinju fruitlessly with the moats becoming full of their dead. On 11 November 1592, a force of Korean guerrillas led by Gwak Jae-u arrived as the relief force, and to fool the Japanese into thinking his force was much larger than it was, Gwak ordered his men to light fires at night on the hills while blowing their conch shells. On 12 November, Hosokawa Tadaoki ordered a final attempt to storm Jinju, with heavy fighting on the northern gates, with General Gim being killed when a Japanese bullet went through his head, but the Korean arquebus fire drove off the Japanese. At that time, another Korean relief force bringing badly needed ammunition arrived up the Nam River, causing Hosokawa to break off the siege, who argued that with the Japanese deep in enemy territory and no reserves to cover his rear that it was too dangerous to continue the siege. Toyotomi Hideyoshi was enraged when he heard of the defeat, saying the Japanese should never be defeated by Koreans, and vowed vengeance. With the help of arquebuses, cannon, and mortars, the Koreans were able to drive the Japanese from Jeolla Province. The battle at Jinju is considered one of the greatest victories of Korea because it prevented the Japanese from entering Jeolla Province.

Intervention of Ming China 
Unable to repel the Japanese invasion, Korea ultimately had to rely on the intervention of Ming China to halt the Japanese advance, despite the various logistical and organizational difficulties suffered by the Japanese.

Korean Court historian and politician Ryu Seong-ryong stated that the Korean naval victory stalled the entire strategy of the invaders by "cutting off one of the arms" with which Japan tried to envelop Korea, isolating Konishi Yukinaga's army at Pyongyang and securing Chinese waters from the feared Japanese attack, such that "the Celestial Army could come by land to the assistance" of Korea.

Viewing the crisis in Joseon, the Wanli Emperor and the Ming court were initially filled with confusion and skepticism as to how their tributary could have been overrun so quickly.

The Korean court was at first hesitant to call for help from the Ming dynasty, and began a withdrawal to Pyongyang. After repeated requests by King Seonjo, and after the Japanese army had already reached Korea's border with China, China finally came to the aid of Korea. China was also somewhat obligated to come to the assistance of Korea because Korea was a vassal state of China, and the Ming dynasty did not tolerate the possibility of a Japanese invasion of China. The local governor at Liaodong eventually acted upon King Seonjo's request for aid following the capture of Pyongyang by sending a small force of 5,000 soldiers led by Zu Chengxun. Zu, a general who had fought successfully against the Mongols and the Jurchens, was over-confident, holding the Japanese in contempt. This cavalry force advanced almost unhindered and managed to enter Pyongyang, but was promptly and decisively defeated by the Japanese troops in the city. On 23 August 1592, the Chinese attacked under the cover of a heavy rainstorm, taking the Japanese by surprise. Once the Japanese realized that they outnumbered the Chinese by six to one, they allowed the Chinese cavalry to spread out over the streets of Pyongyang and counter-attacked, using their superior numbers to annihilate the Chinese. As the Chinese retreated into the muddy fields outside of Pyongyang, the samurai cut them down in the hundreds. One of their leading generals, Shi Ru, was killed in this engagement. The Japanese were elated at having defeated an army from China, the foremost power in East Asia, but Konishi Yukinaga grew despondent over the fall of 1592 as it became clear that no reinforcements would arrive from Japan. The fleet of Admiral Yi Sun-sin was preventing any Japanese ships from landing, while the attacks of the Korean Righteous Army guerrillas left the Japanese forces in northern Korea largely cut off from the forces in southern Korea. At conference in Hanseong, Konishi told Ukita Hideie that he was not certain if Pyongyang could be held if the Chinese were to attack again with greater numbers. During the later half of 1592, the Ming sent investigation teams into Pyongyang to clarify the situation. The Ming became fully aware of the situation and made the decision for a full reinforcement by September 1592. With the victory in Ningxia, the Chinese finally had the forces available for Korea, and Li Rusong, the general who crushed the Ningxia revolt was sent to expel the Japanese from Korea.

By then, it had become clear that this was a situation much more serious than something that could be handled by local forces. Thus, the Ming Emperor mobilized and dispatched a larger force in January 1593 under the general Li Rusong and Imperial Superintendent Song Yingchang, the former being one of the sons of Ming dynasty's Liaodong military magistrate, Li Chengliang, and the latter being a bureaucratic officer (Ming military law stipulated that any military officer would have an accompanying bureaucrat appointed by the Imperial Court acting as the general's superior). According to the collection of letters left by Song Yingchang, the strength of the Ming army was around 40,000, composed mostly of garrisons from the north, including around 3,000 men with experience against Japanese pirates under Qi Jiguang. Li wanted a winter campaign as the frozen ground would allow his artillery train to move more easily than it would under the roads turned into mud by the fall rains. On 5 January 1593, Wu Weizhong led an advance force of 3,000 men across the Yalu River into Korea, followed by two battalions of 2,000 men each later the same day. At Uiju, King Seonjo and the Korean court formally welcomed Li and the other Chinese generals to Korea, where strategy was discussed. 

Thailand, a longtime faithful tributary state of the Chinese dynasties, offered to directly attack Japan to intervene in Toyotomi Hideyoshi's plans, but Ming did not accept, instead ordering Thailand to attack Burma.

Siege of Pyongyang 

On February 5, 1593, the Ming expeditionary army arrived outside Pyongyang accompanied by a group of Korean soldiers. Ming general Li Rusong was appointed the supreme commander of all armies in Korea. After initial attempts to negotiate with the Japanese defenders under Konishi Yukinaga broke down, the two sides began skirmishing on the outskirts over the next couple of days, with Li Rusong attempting to dislodge a Japanese garrison on the hills north of the city while Konishi Yukinaga attempted a night raid on the Ming camp. The Japanese night attack was beaten off by the Chinese fire archers, and Li ordered a feigned retreat, leading the over-confident samurai to fall into a trap, resulting in their annihilation. The Sino-Korean force consisted of 43,000 Chinese, 10,000 Koreans, plus Righteous Army guerrillas, and about 5,000 warrior monks. Li admitted that the Japanese infantry were better equipped with guns, but assured his officers: "Japanese weapons have a range of a few hundred paces, while my great cannon have a range of five to six li [2.4 km]. How can we not be victorious?" The city of Pyongyang was one of the most powerful fortresses in Korea, and to take it, Li's plans called for surrounding the city on all four sides, starting a fierce bombardment under which his infantry would advance.

The Korean warrior monks, led by Abbot Hyujeong, attacked the headquarters of Konishi Yuninaga on Moranbong, coming under heavy Japanese arquebus fire, taking hundreds of dead, but they persevered. Later that same day, the Chinese under Wu Weizhong joined the attack, and with a real danger that Konishi would be cut off from the rest of his army, So Yoshitoshi led a counterattack that rescued the Japanese forces from Moranbong. After the fall of Moranbong after two days fighting, Li Rusong ordered his cannons to open fire while fire arrows and incendiary bombs set much of the city on fire. On the morning of February 6, Li ordered an all-out assault on three sides of the city. The Chinese took heavy losses as the Japanese fire was withering, but Li, whose horse was killed, was able to bring up the siege ladders, called "cloud ladders" by the Chinese. Li had offered 5,000 ounces of silver for the first man to get over the wall, an honor that was claimed by an infantryman from Zhejiang Province named Luo Shangzhi, who got up unto the wall while using his halberd to great effect.

Japanese defenders were forced off the walls fairly quickly, and retreated to the citadel they built on the eastern portions of the city. Chinese officers initially scoffed at the earth walls of the Japanese citadel, but after coming under fire from the Japanese arquebuses, soon learned to respect the defense. The Jingbirok reported: "The enemy built clay walls with holes on top of their fortress, which looked like a beehive. They fired their muskets though those holes as much as they could, and as a result, a number of Chinese soldiers were wounded". The allies were unwilling to commit to a direct assault on the heavily defended fortification during the day. Instead, they left an opening for the Japanese to rally while making preparations for a fire assault on their position at night. Japanese forces sallied out of the undefended eastern walls and made a run for Hanseong, and they were hit with additional ambushes on the way back south and took heavy casualties.

A samurai, Yoshino Jingoze'emon, wrote about the retreat:

The fortress of Pungsan, held by Otomo Yoshimune of the Third Division, had been abandoned and burned down by him, before Konishi's force reached it, adding to the misery of the retreat. Otomo ruined his reputation by retreating without being attacked, and as a result, the Otomo clan, one of the oldest and most respected daimyō families on Kyushu, were disgraced forever, as under Bushido, cowardice was the worst disgrace for a samurai. Otomo's disgrace was also a blow for the efforts of Jesuit missionaries in Japan as Otomo had converted to Catholicism after long talks with the Portuguese Jesuits, and many Japanese concluded that Christianity with its emphasis on love and gentleness was not a suitable religion for a samurai. Song Yingchang's letters on March 1, 1593, described the battle in full to the Ming court. After their defeat, the Japanese shifted their strategy to hit-and-run tactics and ambushes. The use of gunpowder technology and street fighting contributed to the victory, which would permanently deter the invasion.

Battle of Byeokjegwan 

Soon after retaking Pyongyang, Li Rusong also succeeded in retaking the major city of Kaesong on January 19, 1592, and met only minor resistance from the Japanese defenders.

Overconfident with his recent success and possibly misled by false reports, Li Rusong advanced towards the capital city of Hanseong with his allied army of 20,000 on January 21, 1593. On January 26, the force ran into an unexpected confrontation at Byeokjegwan with a large Japanese formation of about 30,000.

Initially, the scouting party of the group under Cha Da Sho and a Korean general confronted a small band of Japanese numbering no more than 600 men. The party overran them successfully but soon ran into a much larger host under Tachibana Muneshige, and retreated to a nearby hill to defend themselves.

Upon hearing of his scouting party's plight, Li decided to rush forward with the rest of his small host. He met up with his scouting party around noon, but by that time even more Japanese forces were converging on the area.

The Ming forces gradually retreated north while fighting off several waves of attacks. Li Rusong and many other generals personally fought in the brawl, and they sustained heavy casualties before they met up with the rest of their army toward the later portion of the day. Li's horse was killed, and he was saved from being cut down by a samurai when a Chinese officer, Li Yousheng, sacrificed himself by taking on the samurai who killed him, but in the interval, Li escaped. During the ferocious fighting, Chinese armor proved no match for the katanas of the Japanese while the Japanese infantry proved equal to repulsing Chinese cavalry. The Japanese pursued the defeated Ming army back up the pass to its highest point, and after a few more hours of fighting. At that point, the Japanese gave up further attacks and both sides pulled back. Because the Ming suffered heavy casualties among their elite retinues, Li became reluctant to move aggressively for the remainder of the war. However, the Japanese victory "did nothing to change the overall strategy, and the retreat from Hanseong was delayed only by a few days".

Battle of Haengju 

The Japanese invasion into Jeolla Province was broken down and pushed back by General Gwon Yul at the hills of Ichiryeong, where outnumbered Koreans fought Japanese troops in the Battle of Byeokjegwan and gained a victory. Gwon Yul quickly advanced northwards, retaking Suwon and then swung north toward Haengju Fortress, a wooden stockade on a cliff over the Han River, where he would wait for Chinese reinforcements. After he was informed that the Ming army under Li Rusong was pushed back at Byeokje, Gwon Yul decided to fortify Haengju. Kwon's force of 2,300 men were a mixture of regulars, warrior monks, and Righteous Army guerrillas.

Bolstered by the victory at the Battle of Byeokjegwan, Katō Kiyomasa and his army of 30,000 men advanced to the south of Hanseong to attack Haengju Fortress, an impressive mountain fortress that overlooked the surrounding area. An army of a few thousand led by Gwon Yul was garrisoned at the fortress, waiting for the Japanese. Katō believed his overwhelming army would destroy the Koreans and therefore ordered the Japanese soldiers to simply advance upon the steep slopes of Haengju with little planning at about 6 am. Gwon Yul responded to the Japanese advance with fierce fire from the fortification using hwachas, rocks, handguns, and bows. The hwach'a ("fire wagon") was a cart that could fire either 100 rockets or 200 arrows at once; the hwach'a took much time to load, but were capable of bringing down deadly fire. Gwon had trained his men to fire their hwach'as all at once, and as the Japanese were packed closely together, the volley from the "fire wagons" inflicted heavy losses. The women of Hanseong joined their menfolk, bringing up rocks in their skirts. In the course of nine assaults, the Japanese pushed the Koreans back to their second line, but could advance no further, losing about 10,000 dead in the process. The Jingbirok wrote: "Gwon Yul ordered his soldiers to gather the dead bodies of the enemy and vent their anger by tearing them apart and hanging them on the branches of the trees". Facing unexpected resistance and mounting casualties, Katō Kiyomasa burned his dead and finally pulled his troops back.

The Battle of Haengju was an important victory for the Koreans, as it greatly improved the morale of the Korean army. The battle is celebrated today as one of the three most decisive Korean victories (the other two being the 1592 Battle of Hansan Island and the siege of Jinju). Today, the site of Haengju fortress has a memorial built to honor Gwon Yul. By this time, the Japanese invasion force of about 150,000 men were down to about 53,000 men, with Chinese reinforcements arriving every day. Most of the Japanese were suffering from hunger, frostbite, and snow-blindness and some Japanese soldiers were so weakened by hunger that they were unable to defend themselves from tigers in the mountains. With the situation untenable, the Japanese retreated to the coast.

Stalemate 
After the Battle of Byeokjegwan, the Ming army took a cautious approach and moved on Hanseong again later in February after the successful Korean defense in the Battle of Haengju.

The two sides remained at a stalemate between the Kaesong to Hanseong line for the next couple of months, with both sides unable and unwilling to commit to further offensives. The Japanese lacked sufficient supplies to move north, and the defeat at Pyongyang had caused part of the Japanese leadership, such as Konishi Yukinaga and Ishida Mitsunari, to seriously consider negotiating with the Ming dynasty forces. This got them into a heated debate with other hawkish generals such as Katō Kiyomasa, and these conflicts would eventually have further implications following the war in Japan when the two sides became rivals in the Battle of Sekigahara.

The Ming forces had their own set of problems. Soon after arriving in Korea, the Ming officials began to note the inadequate logistical supply from the Korean court. The records by Qian Shizhen noted that even after the Siege of Pyongyang, the Ming forces were already stalled for nearly a week due to the lack of supplies, before moving on to Kaesong. As time went on, the situation only become more serious. When the weather warmed, the road conditions in Korea also became terrible, as numerous letters from Song Yingchang and other Ming officers attest, which made resupplying from China itself also a tedious process.

The Korean countryside was already devastated from the invasion when the Ming forces arrived, and in the heart of winter it was extremely difficult for the Koreans to muster sufficient supplies. Even though the court had assigned the majority of the men on hand to tackle the situation, their desire to reclaim their country, along with the militarily inexperienced nature of many of their administrators, resulted in their continual requests to the Ming forces to advance despite the situation. These events created an increasing level of distrust between the two sides.

Though by mid April 1593, faced with ever-greater logistical pressure from a Korean naval blockade of Yi Sun-sin, in addition to a Ming force special operation that managed to burn down a very significant portion of the Japanese grain storage, the Japanese broke off talks and pulled out of Hanseong.

Second siege of Jinju 

Unlike the first siege of Jinju, the second siege resulted in a Japanese victory. Toyotomi Hideyoshi was especially determined to take Jinju and ordered that the previous Japanese failure to take the city be avenged. Ukita Hideie led 90,000 Japanese troops to take Jinju, making it the largest mobilization of Japanese forces for a single operation in the entire war. The Koreans, not knowing where the Japanese were going, divided their forces, with Kim Cheon-il commanding the garrison of 4,000 soldiers at Jinju, who were joined by volunteers, guerrillas, and a small Chinese force, making for a force of about 60,000. On 20 July 1593, the Japanese began to construct wooden shields to allow them to advance against the walls. To the west were Konishi Yukinaga with 26,000 men, and to the north were Kato Kiyomasa with 25,000, while Ukita Hideie commanded the reserve of 17,000. On 21 July 1593, the Japanese attacked, breaking the dyke that filled the moat around Jinju, while the samurai advanced under their wooden shields, to be stopped by Korean fire arrows, cannonballs, and arquebuses. On 23 July, the Japanese attacked with wooden siege towers, which were knocked down by Korean cannon fire. On 25 July, under a flag of truce, Ukita sent a messenger to Kim, telling him that the Japanese would slaughter 10,000 Korean peasants whom they had taken prisoner if Jinju did not surrender at once, but Kim refused, and so 10,000 Korean peasants were beheaded.

The Japanese now attacked with armored carts called "tortoise shell wagons", which allowed the Japanese to advance up to the walls, where the sappers would pull out the stones. But as a Japanese account complained: "They tried to attack, but from inside the castle, pine torches were thrown that set the grass alight. The soldiers inside the tortoise wagons were also burned and retreated". On 27 July, the Japanese again attacked with the "tortoise shell wagons", but this time, there was a heavy thunderstorm that prevented Korean attempts to incinerate the Japanese by dropping torches soaked in fat. The Japanese sappers broke down a section of the wall and a great rush broke out with the samurai pushed each other down as it was a great honor to be the first samurai to enter a fortress. Goto Mototsugu, a retainer of Kuroda Nagamasa, was about to be the first samurai to enter Jinju when Iida Kakbei, a retainer of Kato Kiyomasa, threw the Nichiren flag into the breach to claim that honor for himself. The Korean garrison was out of ammunition and were short of swords, so many Koreans fought with wooden sticks against the onrush of samurai armed with katanas. One Korean, General Sŏ Yewon, engaged in a lengthy single combat with a samurai named Okamoto Gonjo, which ended when the wounded General Sŏ lost his breath and fell down by a tree, and Okamoto took the chance to sever his head with a single blow from his katana. Sŏ's head fell down by the Nam River, which as it was a great honor for a samurai to take the head of their enemies, led Okamoto to order a search to find Sŏ's head, so that it could be salted and taken back to Japan. The Korean commander, General Kim Cheon-il, committed suicide.

As usual, the Japanese took no prisoners, killing almost everyone, both military and civilian, and the Nam River ran red with blood as thousands attempted to swim across it, only to be cut down by the samurai waiting on the other side. The chronicler of the Kato clan noted: "All the Chinese were terrified of our Japanese blades, and jumped into the river, but we pulled them and cut off their heads". Korean accounts mention that almost all of the 60,000 soldiers in Jinju were killed while Japanese accounts mention the samurai sent 20,000 heads back to Japan after their victory. Only the kisaeng (courtesans) of Jinju were spared as they were pressed into service for the victorious Japanese generals at a party they held to celebrate their victory on the evening of the same day at the Ch'oksŏngu Pavilion on a nearby hill, as it offered the best view of the "hellish scene" below them. One courtesan, Nongae, attracted the attention of a samurai, Keyamura Rokunosuke, whom she lured to a cliff by promising him sex, and then threw both herself and him off the cliff, becoming a national heroine in Korea. Jinju was taken only for symbolic purposes, and instead of advancing, the Japanese force at Jinju retreated back to Busan as there was a larger Chinese force to the north. Toyotomi Hideyoshi was well satisfied that he had avenged the defeat of 1592 at Jinju, though Turnbull argued that to lose so many men to take a town only for symbolic reasons was wasteful.

Negotiations and truce between China and Japan (1594–1596)

There were two factors that triggered the Japanese to withdraw: first, a Chinese commando penetrated Hanseong (present-day Seoul) and burned storehouses at Yongsan, destroying most of what was left of the Japanese troops' depleted stock of food. Secondly, Shen Weijing made another appearance to conduct negotiations, and threatened the Japanese with an attack by 400,000 Chinese. The Japanese under Konishi Yukinaga and Katō Kiyomasa, aware of their weak situation, agreed to withdraw to the Busan area while the Chinese would withdraw back to China. A ceasefire was imposed, and a Ming emissary was sent to Japan to discuss peace terms. For the next three years, there was little fighting as the Japanese retained control of a few coastal fortresses, with the rest of Korea being controlled by the Koreans.

By May 18, 1594, all the Japanese soldiers had retreated to the area around Busan and many began to make their way back to Japan. The Ming government withdrew most of its expeditionary force, but kept 16,000 men on the Korean peninsula to guard the truce.

Once peace negotiations between China and Japan finally got underway, Chinese negotiators gave the Ming emperor the mistaken impression that he was about to deal with a minor state that had been subdued by war. Furthermore, they conveyed the idea that the Japanese regent, Toyotomi Hideyoshi, was prepared to become his vassal. Under such conditions, the Chinese sought to resolve the issue in their favor by including Japan in their tributary system of foreign relations. They would establish Hideyoshi as king of Japan and grant him the privilege of formal tribute trade relations with the Ming dynasty.

In Japan, Hideyoshi's negotiators apparently led him to believe that China was suing for peace and was ready to accept him as their emperor. Thus, Hideyoshi issued the demands of a victor; first, a daughter of the Ming emperor must be sent to become the wife of the Japanese emperor; second, the southern provinces of Joseon must be ceded to Japan; third, normal trade relations between China and Japan must be restored; and fourth, a Joseon prince and several high-ranking government officials must be sent to Japan as hostages.

Bargaining from such fundamentally different perspectives, there was no prospect whatsoever for success in the talks. Early in 1597, both sides resumed hostilities.

Chongyu War: Japanese second invasion (1597–1598)

After the failed peace negotiations of the inter-war years, Toyotomi Hideyoshi launched the second invasion of Korea. One of the main strategic differences between the first and second invasions was that conquering China was no longer an explicit goal for the Japanese. Failing to gain a foothold during Katō Kiyomasa's Chinese campaign, and the near complete withdrawal of the Japanese forces during the first invasion, had established that the Korean peninsula was the more prudent and realistic objective.

Soon after the Chinese ambassadors had safely returned to China in 1597, Hideyoshi sent approximately 200 ships with an estimated 141,100 men under the overall command of Kobayakawa Hideaki. Japan's second force arrived unopposed on the southern coast of Gyeongsang Province in 1596. However, the Japanese found that the Korean army was both better equipped and better prepared to deal with an invasion than several years prior. In addition, upon hearing the news in China, the imperial court in Beijing appointed Yang Hao as the supreme commander of an initial mobilization of 55,000 troops from various (and sometimes remote) provinces across China, such as Sichuan, Zhejiang, Huguang, Fujian, and Guangdong. A naval force of 21,000 was included in the effort. Ray Huang, a Chinese-American philosopher and historian, estimated that the combined strength of the Chinese army and navy at the height of the second campaign was around 75,000. Korean forces totaled approximately 30,000 men, with General Gwon Yul's army in Gong Mountain in Daegu, General Gwon Eung's troops in Gyeongju, General Gwak Jae-u's soldiers in Changnyeong, Yi Bok-nam's army in Naju, and Yi Si-yun's troops in Chungpungnyeong.

Initial offensive 

Initially, the Japanese found limited success, being largely confined to Gyeongsang Province and only launching numerous raids to harass and weaken the Korean defenders. In the early autumn of 1597, the Japanese began a more focused and sustained advance. The Japanese planned to attack Jeolla Province in the southwestern part of the peninsula and eventually occupy Jeonju, the provincial capital. Korean success in the First Siege of Jinju in 1592 had mostly saved this area from devastation during the first invasion (the Second Siege of Jinju in 1593, while a Japanese victory, was only undertaken for symbolic purposes). Two Japanese armies, under Mōri Hidemoto and Ukita Hideie, began the assault in Busan and marched towards Jeonju, taking Sacheon and Changpyeong along the way.

Plot to dismiss Yi Sun-sin 

The Korean navy was again to play a crucial part in the second invasion, as in the first, by hampering Japanese advances on land by harassing supply fleets at sea. However, despite his previous successes, Yi Sun-sin was both demoted and jailed by King Seonjo, largely due to a Japanese plot to deceive the Korean court and take advantage of the court's political infighting. Government officials gave direct orders to launch a surprise naval operation against the Japanese, based on a tip from a presumed reliable Japanese spy. Yi refused to obey these orders, knowing that this was an obvious trap meant to have his own fleet sail into an ambush. This development allowed others within the court to further advance their personal agendas while Yi was severely punished. Ultimately, Won Gyun was appointed in Yi Sun-sin's place at the head of the Korean navy.

Battle of Chilcheollyang 

After Won Gyun replaced Yi Sun-sin as head of the Korean navy, he was quick to take action and justify his newly acquired position. He gathered the entire Korean fleet, which now had more than 100 ships, outside of Yeosu, to search for the Japanese. Without any previous preparations or planning, Won Gyun then had his entire fleet sail towards Busan.

After one day at sea, Won Gyun was informed of a large Japanese fleet near Busan. He decided to attack immediately, despite reports of exhaustion among the crews of his ships.

At the subsequent Battle of Chilcheollyang, Won Gyun was completely outmaneuvered by the Japanese in a surprise attack. His ships were overwhelmed by arquebus fire and the traditional Japanese boarding attacks, which largely resulted in the destruction of his entire fleet. Prior to this engagement, Bae Seol (1551–1599), a naval officer who did not submit to Won Gyun's leadership, kept thirteen panokseons under his command and out of the battle, instead escaping to the southwestern Korean coast. These would form the entire fighting force of the Korean navy during the following months.

The Battle of Chilcheollyang was Japan's only decisive naval victory of the war. Won Gyun was himself killed by a Japanese garrison after he struggled ashore on an island following the destruction of his flagship. The victory allowed the Japanese navy to safely escort its troop ships and to support planned landing operations.

Siege of Namwon 

After the disaster at Chilcheollyang, the allied defenses in the south began to quickly break down and the Japanese forces stormed into Jeolla Province. The garrison of Namwon became their next key target.

Namwon was located 50 kilometres southeast of Jeonju. Correctly predicting a Japanese attack, a coalition force of 6,000 soldiers (including 3,000 Chinese troops under Yang Yuan and civilian volunteers) were prepared to fight the approaching Japanese forces. The Japanese laid siege to the walls of the fortress with ladders and siege towers. The two sides exchanged volleys with arquebuses and bows. Eventually, the Japanese forces scaled the walls and sacked the fortress. According to Japanese commander Okochi Hidemoto, author of the Chosen Ki (Korean Record), the Siege of Namwon resulted in 3,726 casualties among the Korean and Chinese forces. The Korean forces and its leaders were almost entirely killed.

When the gates were opened, many Koreans simply laid down on their knees, knowing the samurai would behead them, while others tried to flee north, where the samurai commanded by Katō Yoshiaki and Shimazu Yoshihiro were waiting and proceeded to cut down all Koreans with their katanas. The Japanese Buddhist monk Keinen, who was traveling with the samurai, described a scene of utter horror as the full moon illuminated the scenes of destruction with much of the town on fire, the formerly white walls of Namwon turned red with blood, and the wailing of the Koreans, knowing it was their time to die as the samurai gave no mercy, killing all. Only Yang Yuan managed to sally out after the walls were breached, with a handful of men, to return to Hanseong. He was later executed by the Ming court because of his defeat in battle. Traditionally, samurai collected the heads of those they killed, and Toyotomi Hideyoshi had insisted that the samurai send him the noses of those they had killed as proof that they were fighting. Okochi counted the heads of 3,725 Koreans killed that day, and removed their noses, which were pickled in salt and sent back to Japan. All of the noses of the Koreans killed by the samurai are buried near the shrine to the Great Buddha put up by Hideyoshi in Kyoto, which, as Turnbull noted "...they remain to this day inside Kyoto's least mentioned and most often avoided tourist attraction, the grassy burial mound that bears the erroneous name of the Mimizuka, the 'Mound of Ears'.".

Battle of Hwangseoksan 
Hwangseoksan Fortress consisted of extensive walls that circumscribed the Hwangseok Mountain and garrisoned thousands of soldiers led by generals Jo Jong-do and Gwak Jun. When Katō Kiyomasa laid siege to the mountain with the Army of the Right, and attacked at night under the full moon, the Koreans lost morale and retreated with 350 casualties. The successful siege did not, however, lead to a subsequent advance from beyond Gyeongsang Province.

First Korean and Ming counter offensive 
Upon the start of the second invasion, the Ming Emperor was furious about the entire debacle of the peace talks and turned his wrath on many of its chief supporters; particularly Shi Xing, the Minister of War, who was removed from his position and jailed (he died several years later, in prison). The chief negotiator, Shen Weijing, was executed. Xing Jie, the Chief Commissioner of the Liaodong Commandery, was named the new Minister of War and Yang Hao as the new Chief Superintendent of Korea; Xing Jie himself was also stationed in Korea for the remainder of the war. The Ming leadership quickly pulled in many units stationed near its border with Korea.

Battle of Jiksan 

After the steady advances on land, the Japanese planned to assault Hanseong by late August or early September 1597. However, the plans were foiled by a Ming defense around Jiksan (modern-day Cheonan).

Forces under Kuroda Nagamasa formed the vanguard of the Right Army and marched toward Hanseong, which deeply disturbed the court there. Several of the Ming generals stationed in Korea suggested to the court that they pull back their forces until they could gather more reinforcements, but the Ming administrators overruled their generals and ordered them to make a stand. Thus the Chief Commander of the Ming forces at the time, Ma Gui, sent out General Jie Sheng and three other generals with an elite cavalry force to confront the Japanese forces. The Battle of Jiksan halted the Japanese northward advance.

According to Korean records, the Ming forces ran into the vanguard forces under Kuroda Nagamasa around the area of Jiksan. On the first day, they beat back a small scouting party. On the second day, the two forces clashed in earnest, with the Japanese being beaten back.

Battle of Myeongnyang 

After the debacle in Chilcheollyang, King Seonjo immediately reinstated Yi Sun-sin. Yi Sun-sin quickly returned to Yeosu, where he found the majority of his navy destroyed. Yi re-organized the navy, now reduced to the thirteen ships that Bae Seol had held back from Chilcheollyang and approximately 200 men. On October 26, 1597, in the Myeongnyang Strait, Yi Sun-sin encountered a large Japanese fleet of approximately 133 warships, with a further 200 logistical ships in support. By making use of a narrow passage, Yi positioned his ships in a battle line that prevented the Japanese navy from making use of their numerical superiority. The Battle of Myeongnyang resulted in a Korean victory, with Yi Sun-sin retaking the naval initiative. The Koreans did not lose a single ship and destroyed approximately 30 Japanese combat ships, severely damaging another 30 (the oft-cited number of 333 ships in the Japanese fleet includes support ships, which would not be considered combat ships). The Battle of Myeongnyang is considered Yi Sun-sin's greatest battle, largely as a result of the disparity of numbers. Even after the victory, however, the Joseon navy was still outnumbered by the remaining Japanese navy, so Admiral Yi withdrew to the Yellow Sea to resupply his fleet and have more space for a mobile defense. After the Korean navy withdrew, the Japanese navy made an incursion into the western coast of Korea, near some islands in Yeonggwang County.

Siege of Ulsan 

By January 29, 1598, the Joseon and Ming allied forces achieved victory in Jiksan and pushed the Japanese further south. After the news of the loss at Myeongnyang, Katō Kiyomasa and his retreating army looted Gyeongju, the former capital of Unified Silla.

The Japanese forces sacked the city and many artifacts and temples were destroyed, most prominently, the Bulguksa, a Buddhist temple. Ming and Joseon forces continued to harass the Japanese forces, who then withdrew further south to Ulsan, a harbor that had been an important Japanese trading post a century before, and which Katō had chosen as a strategic stronghold.

Yi Sun-sin's control of the areas around the coast of Jeolla permitted no supply ships to reach the western side of the Korean Peninsula, into which many extensive tributaries merge. Without provisions and reinforcements, the Japanese forces were constrained to the coastal fortresses, known as wajō, that they still controlled. The advancing Ming forces attempted to take advantage of this situation by attacking Ulsan. This siege was the first major offensive from the Ming forces in the second phase of the war.

The effort of the Japanese garrison (about 7,000 men) of Ulsan was largely dedicated to its fortification in preparation for the expected attack. Katō Kiyomasa assigned command and defense of the base to Katō Yasumasa, Kuki Hirotaka, Asano Nagayoshi, and others before proceeding to Sosaengpo near Ulsan. The Ming army's first assault on January 29, 1598, caught the Japanese army unaware and still encamped, for the large part, outside Ulsan's unfinished walls.

A total of around 36,000 troops with the help of singijeons and hwachas nearly succeeded in sacking the fortress, but reinforcements under the overall command of Mōri Hidemoto came across the river to aid the besieged fortress. Although the Japanese garrison was desperately short of supplies, the Ming commander Ma Gui judged the situation to be going against the allies, because more and more Japanese forces began to arrive from the surrounding area and the allied forces were quickly becoming outnumbered. Late one night, Ma Gui decided to order a general organized retreat of the allied forces, but soon confusion set in, and matters were further complicated by heavy rainfall and harassing attacks by the Japanese. The Chief Superintendent Yang Hao panicked and left hastily for Hanseong ahead of the army.

The general retreat quickly turned into a chaotic rout, of which the Japanese took quick advantage by attacking the retreating Ming and Joseon forces. The retreating Ming and Joseon forces had 20,000 losses. The disaster was a heavy setback for Joseon, who would not be in a position to move on the Japanese position again for more than eight months.

Final allied offensive of 1598 
After the siege at Ulsan, the two sides remained in a stalemate for the next several months. Xing Jie decided that they would require further reinforcements to launch a final large offensive to permanently remove the Japanese presence on the Korean Peninsula.

Reinforcements from China began to pour in through most of mid-1598, with Chen Lin and Deng Zilong and their navy arriving in May. By September 1598, the Ming presence in Korea had swelled to 75,000 overall, by far the largest at any point in the war.

Xing Jie divided his forces into four groups, with Ma Gui leading the offensive against Ulsan yet again, Li Rumei (Li Rusong's brother) leading the offensive against Sacheon, Chen Lin commanding the navy, and Liu Ting and Yi Sun-sin coordinating a land-sea effort against Suncheon.

Just before they set out, however, news came that Li Rusong was killed by Mongolian tribesmen back in Liaodong. Xing Jie decided then to remove his emotionally weakened brother Li Rumei in favor of Dong Yiyuan.

In June 1598, after Commander Konishi Yukinaga raised concerns about the supply situation and limited prospects for further territorial gains in the peninsula, 70,000 troops were withdrawn back to Japan, with only 60,000 left behind to guard the territory still under Japanese control. These forces were mostly Satsuma soldiers of the Shimazu clan under commanders Shimazu Yoshihiro and his son Tadatsune. Kato Kiyomasa remained in command of the defenses of Ulsan while Konishi Yukinaga himself commanded the defenses at Suncheon. The forces at Sacheon and Ulsan continued to be engaged in a military deadlock in the months that followed.

At Ulsan, Kato Kiyomasa defended the castle with 10,000 Japanese soldiers. In September 1598, 29,500 Ming and Joseon troops tried again to capture Ulsan Castle, but all their attempts were repulsed by the Japanese. The Ming and Joseon forces withdrew with heavy losses.

Battle of Sacheon 

The Chinese believed that Sacheon was crucial to their goal of retaking the lost castles in Korea and ordered a general attack. Although the Chinese made initial progress, the tide of battle turned when Japanese reinforcements attacked the rear of the Chinese army and the Japanese soldiers inside the fortress sallied from the gates and counter-attacked. The Chinese Ming forces retreated with 30,000 losses, with the Japanese in pursuit. According to Chinese and Korean sources concerning the battle, the forces led by Dong Yiyuan had breached the castle wall and were making progress in capturing the castle until a gunpowder accident caused an explosion in their camp, and the Japanese took advantage of the situation to rout the confused and weakened troops.

Siege of Suncheon 

At Suncheon, Konishi Yukinaga defended his position at the Suncheon Castle along with 13,700 Japanese soldiers. A total of 43,000 Ming and Joseon troops tried to capture it, but their attempts were repulsed after three failed assaults, suffering 800 losses.

Death of Hideyoshi 
In the fall of 1598, following the successful Japanese defense at the battles of Sacheon, Ulsan, and Suncheon, the Ming, Joseon, and Japanese forces were locked in a military stalemate in the south of the peninsula. After the death of Toyotomi Hideyoshi on September 18, 1598, the Council of Five Elders, in late October, issued orders for the withdrawal of all forces from Korea. Hideyoshi's death was kept a secret by the Council to preserve the morale of the army.

Battle of Noryang 

The Battle of Noryang was the final naval battle in the war. A Japanese fleet of approximately 500 ships, under Shimazu Yoshihiro, was assembled and preparing to link up with the blockaded fleet under Konishi Yukinaga, and together withdraw via Busan back to Japan.

The Korean navy under Yi Sun-sin discovered the Shimazu fleet anchored in the narrow strait of Noryang. Noting the narrow geography of the area, Ming general Chen Lin, who led Deng Zilong and Yi Sun-sin, made a surprise attack against the Japanese fleet, under the cover of darkness on December 16, 1598, using cannon and fire arrows.

By dawn, more than half of the Japanese fleet was scattered and destroyed. During the pursuit of the remaining Japanese ships, both Yi Sun-sin and Deng Zilong were killed. Despite suffering high casualties, in the end the battle was a great tactical victory for the Korean forces and resulted in the loss of over half of the Japanese fleet and the deaths of thousands of their men.

Strategically, the Japanese attained their objective by allowing Konishi Yukinaga, who was earlier blockaded by the Ming and Korean forces, to leave his fortress on December 16 with his men and withdraw unopposed by sailing through the southern end of Namhae Island, bypassing both the Noryang Strait and the battle, with the cost of betraying his own fellow Japanese generals. Konishi Yukinaga, Shimazu Yoshihiro, Katō Kiyomasa, and other Japanese generals of the Left Army, congregated in Busan and withdrew to Japan on December 21. The last ships damaged sailed to Japan on December 24, bringing an end to six years of war.

Post-war negotiations
As Tsushima Island had suffered greatly from its loss of trade with Korea as a result of the invasions, Sō Yoshitoshi of the Sō clan, then dominant in Tsushima, undertook the lead in the peace negotiations by Japan. He sent four peace missions to Joseon in 1599 to normalize relations. The first three were captured and sent directly to Beijing by Chinese troops, but the fourth one, in 1601, successfully obtained from the Joseon court the promise of a normalizing of relations upon the return of remaining Joseon captives. As Ming troops continued to be present in Korea following the withdrawal of Japanese forces, the major incentive for Joseon for the normalization of relations with Japan was the withdrawal of the Chinese soldiers from their territory. The Ming Chinese themselves were causing havoc, and their presence continued to strain Joseon's national economy and infrastructure. In response to the Joseon request, Yoshitoshi promptly released several Joseon prisoners and between 1603 and 1604 helped the Joseon envoys to repatriate a further 3,000 by organizing negotiations at Kyoto with Tokugawa Ieyasu, by then the shogun of Japan.

In the continuation of the diplomatic talks toward peaceful relations, Joseon in 1606 expanded its conditions and demanded that the shogun write a formal letter requesting peace, and to extradite the Japanese soldiers who had defiled the Joseon Royal Tombs near Hanseong. Realizing that the Shogunate would never agree to such a request, Sō Yoshitoshi sent a forged letter and a group of criminals instead; the great need to expel the Ming soldiers pushed Joseon into accepting and to send an emissary in 1608. The end result was a return of Joseon prisoners and the restoration of diplomatic and trade relations between the two countries.

Aftermath and conclusion

The Japanese invasions were East Asia's first regional wars involving massed armies equipped with modern weapons. The conflict saw the regular employment of Japanese armies of up to 200,000 men, Ming Chinese armies of 80,000, and the ongoing deployment of local Korean forces numbering in the hundreds of thousands.

The invasions also stood as a challenge to the existing Chinese world order on two levels: the military, in which the war challenged Ming China's status as the supreme military power in East Asia, and the political, in which the war affirmed Chinese willingness to aid in the protection of its tributary states.

Losses and gains
Contrary to Toyotomi Hideyoshi's intentions, the cost of the Japanese invasions of Korea significantly weakened the Toyotomi clan's power in Japan. After Hideyoshi's death, his young son Toyotomi Hideyori became head of the Toyotomi clan. However, the losses suffered by varying daimyōs during the campaign were a contributing factor to the imbalance of power in Japan after the war. As the western-based daimyōs of Kyushu and western Honshu (partially by geographic convenience) contributed the majority of the forces used during the Korean conflict, it left the pro-Hideyoshi alliance weakened for the eventual struggle with the mostly eastern-backed forces of Tokugawa Ieyasu (who himself never sent forces to Korea). Tokugawa would go on to unify Japan and establish himself as shogun in 1603, following the decisive Battle of Sekigahara against a coalition of mostly western-based daimyōs.

Ming China also sustained a heavy financial burden for its role in defending Korea while also fighting several other conflicts in the same decade. The war also indirectly weakened China's position in Manchuria, which gave the fledgling Manchu chieftain Nurhaci an opportunity to expand his influence and territory. Nurhaci's conquests would culminate in the eventual collapse of the Ming dynasty and the rise of the Qing dynasty in 1644. However, the sinocentric tributary system that the Ming had defended continued to be maintained by the Qing, and ultimately, the war resulted in a maintenance of the status quo—with the re-establishment of trade and the normalization of relations between all three parties.

Given that the conflict was fought exclusively on Korean soil, Korea ultimately suffered the most damage of the three participants. It lost a large portion of its military strength and civilian population, had numerous cultural heritage sites damaged or destroyed, and many of its technological advancements pillaged. In many ways the invasions proved to be more devastating than any other event in the nation's history (even, arguably, more so than the Korean War). The peninsula suffered a reduction of arable land to 66% of the prewar total, greatly hurting Korea's mainly agricultural economy; in the years that followed, famine, disease, and rebellions were widespread throughout Korea. In Gyeongsang Province alone 90% of the land under cultivation was destroyed. Significant losses of historical archives, cultural and scientific artifacts (such as the Ja-gyuk-roo water clock), and skilled artisans resulted in a waning of Korean science. The main Korean royal palaces Gyeongbokgung, Changdeokgung, and Changgyeonggung were burned down, and Deoksugung was used as a temporary palace. The Baekjeong (Korean natives of the lowest social rank) took advantage of the lack of internal security brought on by the invasions, and set fire to changnye (Korean government offices) in which census ledgers had been kept. The destruction of land and census registers made fiscal recovery difficult since taxation and corvée labour were based on them. The government was forced to trade rank and titles in order to obtain grain, using a practise called napsok pogwan (appointment through grain contributions), and the yangban elite, which was exempt from household taxes, exploited the occasion to increase its landholdings, thereby further depriving the central government of taxes raised on property.

The total military and civilian casualties, as estimated by the late-19th-century historian, George H. Jones, were one million, and total combat casualties were estimated at between 250,000 and 300,000. A total of over 100,000 Japanese, 185,000 Korean and over 29,000 Chinese troops were killed, and an estimated 50,000 to 60,000 captives were taken by the Japanese throughout the war. Among those captured, a total of 7,500 were later returned to Korea through diplomatic means at the conclusion of the conflict. A large portion of the remaining captives were sold to European traders—mainly Portuguese in Macau, who then resold them throughout Southeast Asia.

Although Korea suffered the most of the three combatants, there were some significant technological and cultural transfers that resulted from the war. Arquebus rifles, which the Joseon Court had initially dismissed as ineffective and useless due to their low rate of fire, was rapidly adopted during and after the war by the Joseon Military and production began as early as 1593. Some scholars believe the Joseon-Ming Army was not easily driven out and defeated during the reignition of hostilities in 1597 was in part due to the widespread adoption of arquebuses in the Joseon military. Besides this, Catholicism was first introduced in Korea during the war, as Catholic missionaries had begun arriving in Japan before the war and had become acquainted. In Korea, many of the first converts to Catholicism were Korean captives in Japan, records indicate more than 7,000 Korean captives converted from 1594 to 1598. Spanish missionary Gregorio de Cespedse (1551–1661) was a prominent driver behind this missionary work, and was also the first recorded Westerner to arrive in Korea and the only European eyewitness to the war. Last but not least, significant food and luxury items were introduced to Korea via the invasions. Evidence heavily suggests this, because Korean records initially recorded chili peppers, one of the most important ingredients in modern Korean cuisine as "Japanese mustard", "southern barbarian herb" and "Japanese herb."

The captives brought to Japan, including scholars, craftsmen, medicine makers, and gold smelters, provided Japan with many cultural and technological gains. In the years that followed, Japanese pottery and art advanced and developed a significant similarity to their Korean counterparts. Advances in other areas such as agriculture were also aided by technology and artisans acquired and captured during the invasions. Japanese typography advanced with the adoption of Chinese fonts. Because Korean pottery was highly prized in Japan, many Japanese lords established pottery-producing kilns with captured Korean potters in Kyushu and other parts of Japan. The production of Arita porcelain in Japan began in 1616 at the town of Imari with the aid of Korean potters who had been enticed to relocate there after the war.

Furthermore, Neo-Confucianism, which had originated from China and spread to Korea, was introduced to Japan because of the invasions. Many Korean scholars who were captured during the war by the Japanese would later become tutors of prominent Japanese daimyo. Furthermore, many classical Confucian texts were captured during the early stages of the war and taken back to Japan.

War atrocities

Japanese troops engaged in crimes against civilians in battles and often killed indiscriminately. Scorched earth policies were often employed: crops were burned, and farm animals were slaughtered to prevent their use by Joseon or Ming forces. Outside of the main battles, raids to acquire food and supplies from civilians were common. Captured prisoners were often mistreated or worked to near-death by starvation and neglect. In following their battlefield practice at the time, the Japanese also collected the ears and noses of dead soldiers as proof of their exploits on the battlefield and as a record of casualty counts. The high casualty rate of the Joseon and Ming forces, and the large number of ears collected during the campaign was enough to build a large mound near Toyotomi Hideyoshi's Great Buddha, called the Mimizuka ("Mound of Ears").

Korean armies were also known to forcefully acquire food and supplies from civilians, both on an individual and organized level. Korean bandits and highwaymen also took advantage of the chaos during the war to form raiding parties and rob other Koreans.

According to British historian who specializes in Japanese military history, Stephen Turnbull, the Ming forces arriving in support of Joseon were often no better than the Japanese in the amount of destruction they caused and the degree of the crimes they committed. According to Turnbull, Ming forces often did not distinguish between loyal Joseon civilians and Japanese collaborators. After the Battle of Noryang, the Chinese general Chen Lin killed the civilians of Namhae Island who were labelled as Japanese collaborators. After the immediate Japanese military threat was neutralized, Turnbull states that the Joseon desire for the Ming armies to quickly withdraw from Korean territory was a contributing factor to the pace of the eventual peace resolution.

Rape was common during the war, and Korean women were indiscriminately assaulted and brutalized by Japanese, Chinese and Korean soldiers throughout the conflict. Records from the war indicate that Japanese soldiers "frequently decapitated all the young men of a locale and carried off all the attractive women—along with the goods they had stolen—on the backs of horses and oxen" and descriptions claim that the key priorities of Japanese soldiers during the conflict were "granaries, understanding local geography, and beautiful women." Meanwhile, Joseon soldiers, such as those led by Kim Myon, captured not only Japanese soldiers but also many Korean women who had "been taken prisoner by the enemy. [The women] begged for their lives, only to be burned to death by the Choso˘n guerrillas along with the Japanese." Records also indicate that Ming Chinese and Joseon Korean forces committed rape against the civilian populace during the conflict. This became one of the primary reasons why the Joseon royal court pushed for peace negotiations with Japan in the early 1600s, in order to remove the Ming Chinese military presence in Korea as well as completely demobilizing the Joseon military forces, both of which had committed significant atrocities against the civilian populace.

Legacy
The war left significant legacies in all three countries. In the context of Japanese imperialism, the invasions are seen as the first Japanese attempt to become a global power. The partial occupation of Korea developed the Japanese concept that Korea belonged within Japan's sphere of influence, and the Japanese leaders of the late 19th and the early 20th centuries used the 1592–1597 invasions to reinforce the justification for their 20th-century annexation of Korea. Yi-Sun Sin's accomplishments in the war also inspired Japanese naval officers during the 19th and 20th centuries, with many of them citing the importance of studying his battle tactics to further strengthen their navy.

In China, the war was used politically to inspire nationalistic resistance against Japanese imperialism during the 20th century. In Chinese academia, historians list the war as one of the Wanli Emperor's "Three Great Punitive Campaigns". Contemporary Chinese historians often use the campaigns as an example of the friendship that China and Korea shared.

In Korea, the war is a historic foundation of Korean nationalism and, as in China, inspired and politically used to instigate nationalistic resistance against Japanese imperialism during the 20th century. Korea gained several national heroes during the conflict, including Yi Sun-sin and Chen Lin (founder of the Gwangdong Jin clan). Modern anti-Japanese sentiment in Korea can be traced as far back as the Japanese invasions in 1592, although the principal cause is rooted in more recent events, particularly the hardships suffered by Koreans during the Japanese occupation of Korea from 1910 through 1945. The widespread guerilla warfare fought by various righteous armies, which spearheaded the Korean civilian resistance against the Japanese invasion, had a significant impact on the common Korean populace's conceptions of nationhood and identity. The invasions and subsequent efforts by the local gentry to rally the commoners had a critical impact on perceptions of national identity in Korea, as the gentry were recorded to have sent many letters and declarations against the Japanese invaders and called upon shared Korean history, culture and beliefs to unite the Korean people.

International awareness
Despite great interest in the war in East Asia, the Japanese invasions of Korea are not widely known in the West. Many history textbooks treat the war with only a few lines of mention, and with the exception of Samurai Invasion: Japan's Korean War 1592–98 (2002) by Turnbull, no complete academic studies on the subject exist in English, although both James Murdoch and George Sansom covered the topic in some detail in their general historical surveys of Japan, A History of Japan (1903) and A History of Japan (1958), respectively. Henry Kissinger mentions the conflict in World Order (2014).

See also
 Timeline of the Japanese invasions of Korea (1592–98)
 List of battles during the Japanese invasions of Korea (1592–98)
 List of naval battles during the Japanese invasions of Korea (1592–98)
 Naval history of Korea
 Japanese castles in Korea
 Anti-Japanese sentiment in Korea

Footnotes

References
 Note: All websites are listed here independently from the References section.

Bibliography

 
 
 
 
 
 
 
 
 
 
 桑田忠親 [Kuwata, Tadachika], ed., 舊參謀本部編纂, [Kyu Sanbo Honbu], 朝鮮の役 [Chousen no Eki]　(日本の戰史 [Nihon no Senshi] Vol. 5), 1965.

Primary sources
 Li, Guang-tao [李光濤], The research of the Imjin Japanese crisis of Korea [朝鮮壬辰倭亂研究], (Central research academy) 中央研究院 .
 The annals of King Seonjo [宣祖實錄]
 中興誌
 趙慶男, 亂中雜錄
 Qian Shizheng (錢世楨), The Records of the eastern expedition (征東實紀)
 Song Yingchang (宋應昌), The letter collections of the restoration management. [經略復國要編]
 Han, Woo-keun. The History of Korea. Trans. Kyung-shik Lee. Ed. Grafton K. Mintz. Seoul: Eul-Yoo, 1970.
 Lee, Ki-baik. A New History of Korea. Trans. Edward W. Wagner and Edward J. Schultz. Seoul: Ilchokak, 1984.
 Nahm, Andrew C. Introduction to Korean History and Culture. Seoul: Hollym, 1993.
 Sansome, George. A History of Japan. Stanford: Stanford UP, 1961.
 Yi, Sun-sin. Nanjung ilgi: War Diary of Admiral Yi Sun-sin. Trans. Tae-hung Ha. Ed. Pow-key Sohn. Seoul: Yonsei UP, 1977.

External links

 Toyotomi Hideyoshi's Korean Invasions: the Bunroku Campaign (1592–93)
 The Battles of Imjin Waeran (in Korean)
 The Imjin Waeran (in Korean)
 Jinju National Museum is dedicated to this topic. Information in English and Korean.
 The Imjinwaeran (in English)

 
Anti-Japanese sentiment in Korea
Anti-Japanese sentiment in China
Joseon dynasty
1590s in Japan
Japan–Korea relations
Korea
Anti-Korean sentiment in Japan